= 2024 Minas Gerais road crash =

2024 road accident in Brazil

Minas Gerais road crash
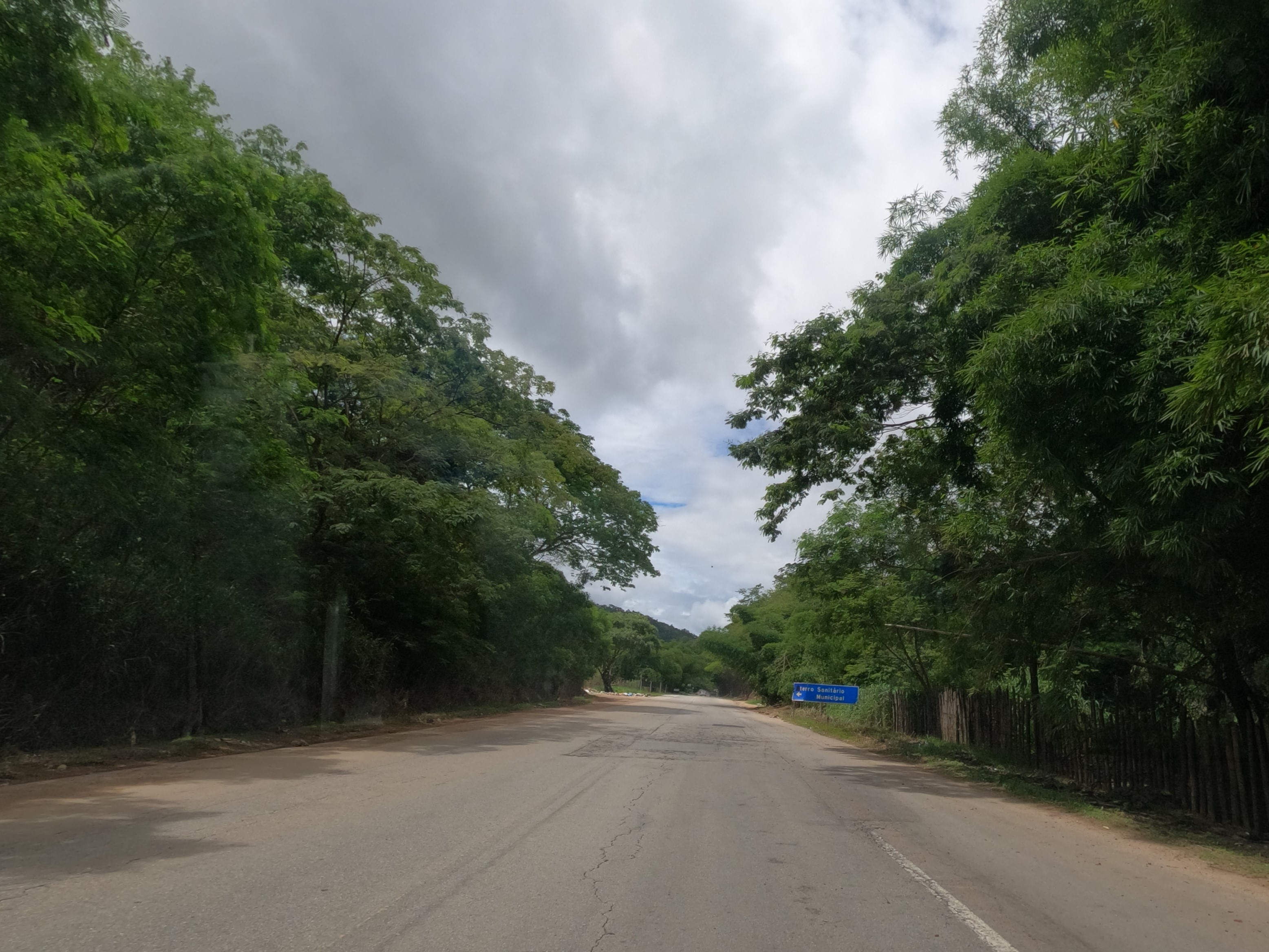
- BR-116 in Teófilo Otoni, the highway where the crash occurred

Details
- Date: 21 December 2024 c. 4:00 a.m. BRT
- Location: Lajinha, Teófilo Otoni, Minas Gerais
- Coordinates: 17°56′26″S 41°31′43″W
- Country: Brazil
- Incident type: Multiple-vehicle collision
- Cause: Under investigation; likely a fire, after a collision between a bus and a fallen granite block or a B-double due to a tire burst

Statistics
- Vehicles: 3
- Deaths: 39
- Injured: 7

On 21 December 2024, a multiple-vehicle collision involving a passenger bus, a car and a B-double road train occurred in Lajinha, a district of Teófilo Otoni, Minas Gerais, Brazil, on the BR-116 highway. Thirty-nine people died, and seven others were injured. It is the deadliest traffic accident on federal highways in Brazil since 2007, when such numbers began to be monitored.

== Background ==
The BR-116 highway is described as the road with the most deaths in Brazil. With an extensive road network and a busy flow of heavy trucks, especially in granite-producing regions in northern Minas Gerais, serious crashes are frequent, including during the intense end-of-year season. Experts say the highway suffers from structural problems and insufficient inspection. The Rodovia Régis Bittencourt (lit. 'Régis Bittencourt Highway'), and in particular the Taboão da Serra–Curitiba section, is nicknamed the "Highway of Death" (Rodovia da Morte) due to its high number of lethal accidents.

According to data from the National Transport Confederation (CNT), the state of Minas Gerais has the most crashes and fatal victims on Brazilian highways. The National Department of Transport Infrastructure (DNIT) said that the speed limit radar near the crash site was removed after the end of the contract with the company responsible for the equipment.

In addition, the country had a history of deadly bus crashes in the decade before: in 2015, a tourist bus fell into a ravine in Joinville, Santa Catarina, resulting in at least 51 casualties; in 2020, 41 people died, and 10 others were injured after a collision between a bus and a truck near Taguaí, São Paulo, on the SP-249 state highway.

== Collision ==
Initial reporting by firefighters claimed that a passenger bus travelling on the BR-116 highway from São Paulo to Bahia (Note: Divergent domestic sources suggested that the planned destination of the bus was either Vitória da Conquista or Elísio Medrado.) had a tire blowout, causing it to lose control and collide with an oncoming B-double truck at around 4 a.m. local time. However, according to the Federal Highway Police, the collision likely occurred when a granite block fell from the truck and hit the bus, which consequently lost control and caught fire. Afterward, a Fiat Argo car collided with the back of the truck. Its occupants were trapped underneath the vehicle, but survived. They also reported the bus had a right-rear tire burst. A survivor on the bus said the vehicle that originally left São Paulo was replaced en route by the one that ended up crashing. The bodies of most of the fatalities were found to be charred.

Police believe the truck driver, whose license was suspended after refusing to take a breathalyzer test two years prior, fled the crash scene without injuries. Receipts showed the truck he drove had left Ceará toward Espírito Santo. Police also said the weight of the granite block exceeded the permitted limit. The moment of the impact and the explosion was captured by a closed-circuit television camera.

== Aftermath ==
=== Reactions ===
On his X account, President of Brazil Luiz Inácio Lula da Silva offered his condolences to the victims' families, stating: "I immensely regret and send my prayers to the relatives of the more than 30 fatal victims from the accident in Teófilo Otoni, Minas Gerais. I pray for the recovery of the survivors of this terrible tragedy."

Governor of Minas Gerais Romeu Zema promised "full mobilization" to assist the victims.

Emtram, the transport company that operated the bus involved, issued a note regretting the crash and offering assistance to the affected people.

=== Surrender of the truck driver and arrest ===
Two days later, on 23 December, the suspected truck driver, Arilton Bastos Alves, turned himself in to local police. After being heard, he was not immediately held in custody, because the request for his preventive detention was judicially rejected, as it was no longer possible to detain him in flagrante.

On 21 January 2025, the driver was finally arrested. A drug test carried out on 23 December found cocaine and ecstasy in his system, as well as MDA, alprazolam and venlafaxine.

== See also ==
- List of traffic collisions (2000–present)
- Transport in Brazil
