= Cesário Lange =

Municipality in the state of São Paulo in Brazil

- Municipality
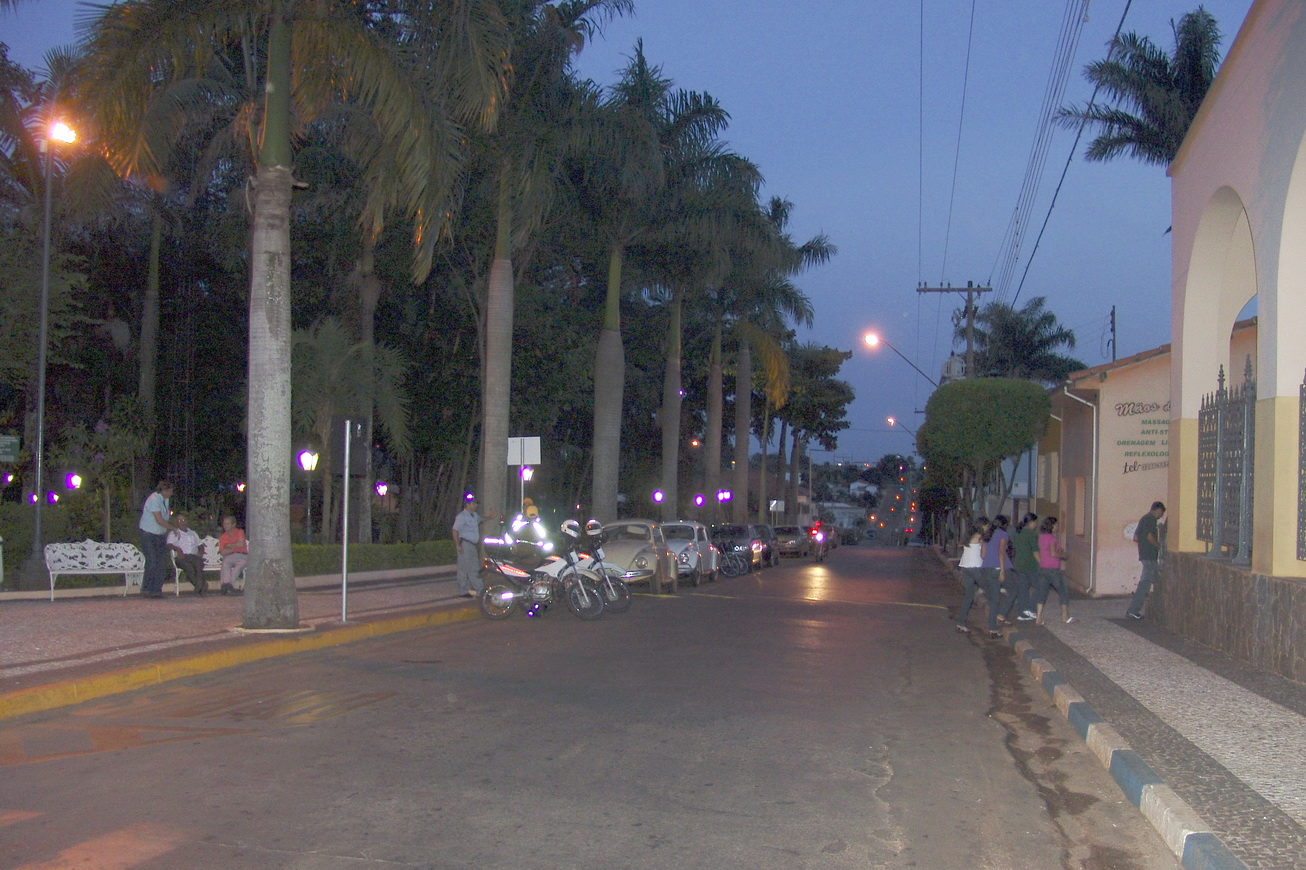
- Square in the city center

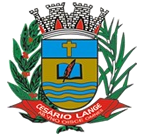
- Flag Coat of arms
- Motto: Ab uno disce omnes (From one learn all)
- Location in São Paulo state

- Location in Brazil
- Coordinates: 23°13′36″S 47°57′11″W
- Country: Brazil
- Region: Southeast Brazil
- State: São Paulo
- Metropolitan Region: Sorocaba
- Founded: December 12, 1878

Area
  - Total: 190.39 km^{2} (73.51 sq mi)
- Elevation: 590 m (1,940 ft)

Population (2020)
  - Total: 18,375
  - Density: 96.512/km^{2} (249.97/sq mi)
- Time zone: UTC−3 (BRT)
- Postal code: 18125
- HDI (2000): 0.767 – medium
- Website: Official website

Cesário Lange is a Brazilian municipality in the state of São Paulo. It is part of the Metropolitan Region of Sorocaba, and the statistical mesoregion of Itapetininga and microregion Tatuí. The population is 18,375 (2020 est.) in an area of 190.39 square kilometres (73.51 sq mi).

== History ==
The municipality was founded in December 12, 1878 by João Mendes de Almeida, according to Law No. 29/64. It was assigned town category under Law No. 5285 of February 18, 1959, implemented January 1, 1960. Its political emancipation was made under Law No. 28 of August 19, 1966. The town was named in honor of Cesario Lange Adrien, its first teacher. Almeida built the first chapel in the city, dedicated to Santa Cruz, which was subsequently enlarged into a church.

== Highways ==
- SP-280: Rodovia Presidente Castelo Branco.
- SP-143: Cesário Lange / Pereiras - Rodovia Marechal Rondon.
- SP-141: Cesário Lange / Porangaba.
- SP-127: Cesário Lange / Tatuí.
- Highway Otávio Pilon: Vicinal Cesário Lange / Cerquilho - Rodovia do Açúcar.

== Economy and religion ==
Agriculture, industry, religious tourism and leisure are some of the economic activities practiced in the city, which is a breeding center thoroughbred horses.

In the city of Cesário Lange, is the Associação Torre de Vigia de Bíblias e Tratados (Watch Tower Bible and Tract Association), the Brazilian headquarters of Jehovah's Witnesses religious group. That site is organized the work of the Witnesses in the country and print millions of Bible literature that are sent to all the Portuguese-speaking world, including Portugal.

== Media ==
In telecommunications, the city was served by Companhia Telefônica Brasileira until 1973, when it began to be served by Telecomunicações de São Paulo. In July 1998, this company was acquired by Telefónica, which adopted the Vivo brand in 2012.

The company is currently an operator of cell phones, fixed lines, internet (fiber optics/4G) and television (satellite and cable).

== See also ==
- List of municipalities in São Paulo
- Interior of São Paulo
