= Vargem Grande do Sul =

- Municipality
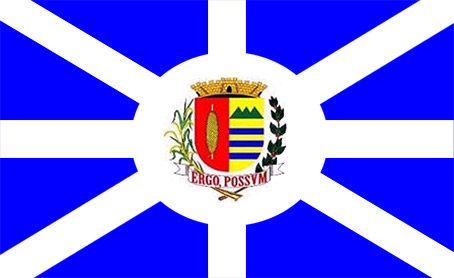
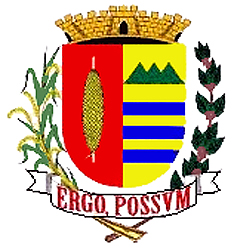
- Flag Coat of arms

- Location in São Paulo state

- Location in Brazil
- Coordinates: 21°49′58″S 46°53′32″W
- Country: Brazil
- Region: Southeast
- State: São Paulo

Area
  - Total: 267 km^{2} (103 sq mi)

Population (2020)
  - Total: 43,110
  - Density: 161/km^{2} (418/sq mi)
- Time zone: UTC−3 (BRT)

Vargem Grande do Sul (Portuguese for "Southern Great Lowland") is a municipality in the northeast of the state of São Paulo in Brazil. The population is 43,110 (2020 est.) in an area of 267 km^{2} (103 sq mi). The elevation is 721 m. Access through state roads SP-344 and SP-215. The Human Development Index is 0.802.

== History ==
Vargem Grande do Sul roots lie in a little hamlet in the way of a "Bandeirante" route ("Bandeirante" routes were those used by the first explorers of the country's interior in the 17th century, known as Bandeirantes, who composed colonial scouts known as the "Bandeiras"). This hamlet was first noted in 1832 and called "Várzea Grande".

In 1888 the district Vargem Grande was created within the municipality São João da Boa Vista. The independent municipality Vargem Grande was established in 1922. Its name was changed into Vargem Grande do Sul in 1944.

It was by the end of the 19th century and beginning of the 20th century the arrival of the first immigrants that eventually replaced slaves in coffee farms when slavery was abolished. European immigrants would quickly increase in noticeable numbers in the municipality and the state of São Paulo so that they became the majority population.

== Geography ==
Vargem Grande do Sul is located in the northeast of the state of São Paulo in Brazil, in a region known as the Mogiana. In the rural surroundings of the municipality coffee was traditionally produced, although it has currently given place mostly to potato farms. The population in 2004 was 39,047 and the area is 267.26 km². The elevation is 721 m.

Summer is usually warm and winter dry. Temperature ranges from 35 to 10 degrees Celsius, and average is 27.

Rivers "Jaguari-Mirim", "Verde" and "Fartura" cross the municipality's territory.

== Population ==
Most of Vargem Grande do Sul's inhabitants descend from European immigrants, especially from Italy. Italian family dominate the register of the municipality. Significant families include the Baizi, the Bassi, the Beloni, the Bortoloto, the Buzato, the Canal, the Coracini, the Cossi, the Filipini, the Longuini, the Lupetti, the Marquesini, the Menossi, the Molinari, the Nardini, the Pratali, the Pecinato, the Rocchetto, the Sartori and the Sbardelini.

At the beginning of the 20th century, some of those families, and others, founded the mutual aid "Società de Mutuo Socorso" to help members, offering among other services free health care and coffins. The organization continues to hold dinners and dances. At the time of the Second World War, the Brazilian government prohibited the use of enemy languages in the country, such as Italian and German spoken so widely at the time, so it was renamed "Sociedade Beneficente Brasileira". The change was imposed on many institutions and associations throughout Brazil; state capital football team Società Esportiva Palestra Italia became Sociedade Esportiva Palmeiras.

The municipality's population has historically middle class, showed little social segregation and has a peaceful profile.

== Dialect ==
Specially in the 19th century, Brazilian Portuguese was highly influenced by the many European immigrants who settled in Brazil's many regions and states, specially in central and southern Brazil. In the Second World War, people were prohibited to speak their mother languages and had to learn and start using Portuguese quickly. That explains the different dialects verified throughout the country. Vargem Grande do Sul's dialect has been identified as a variation of the "Southern Dialect", spoken in a large isogloss, by Antenor Nascentes in 1922, and more specifically as a variation of the "Caipira dialect" by Amadeu Amaral in 1976.

Municipality's vocabulary includes words and expressions that are typical of the Mogiana region (e.g. "posar" instead of "dormir") and Italian or Italian-derived words and expressions (e.g. "fetta" or "feta" instead of "pedaço").

== Religion ==
Vargem Grande do Sul's population is mainly Catholic. As regards the Catholic Church, the municipality belongs to the Diocese of São João da Boa Vista. Founded by Dom Lino Deodato Rodrigues de Carvalho in 1891, Paróquia Sant'Ana (Sant'Ana Parish) is the 10th biggest in the region.

== Media ==
In telecommunications, the city was served by Telecomunicações de São Paulo. In July 1998, this company was acquired by Telefónica, which adopted the Vivo brand in 2012. The company is currently an operator of cell phones, fixed lines, internet (fiber optics/4G) and television (satellite and cable).

== See also ==
- List of municipalities in São Paulo
