= Rodovia Renê Benedito Silva =

Highway in São Paulo, Brazil

SP-274
- Rodovia Engenheiro Renê Benedito da Silva
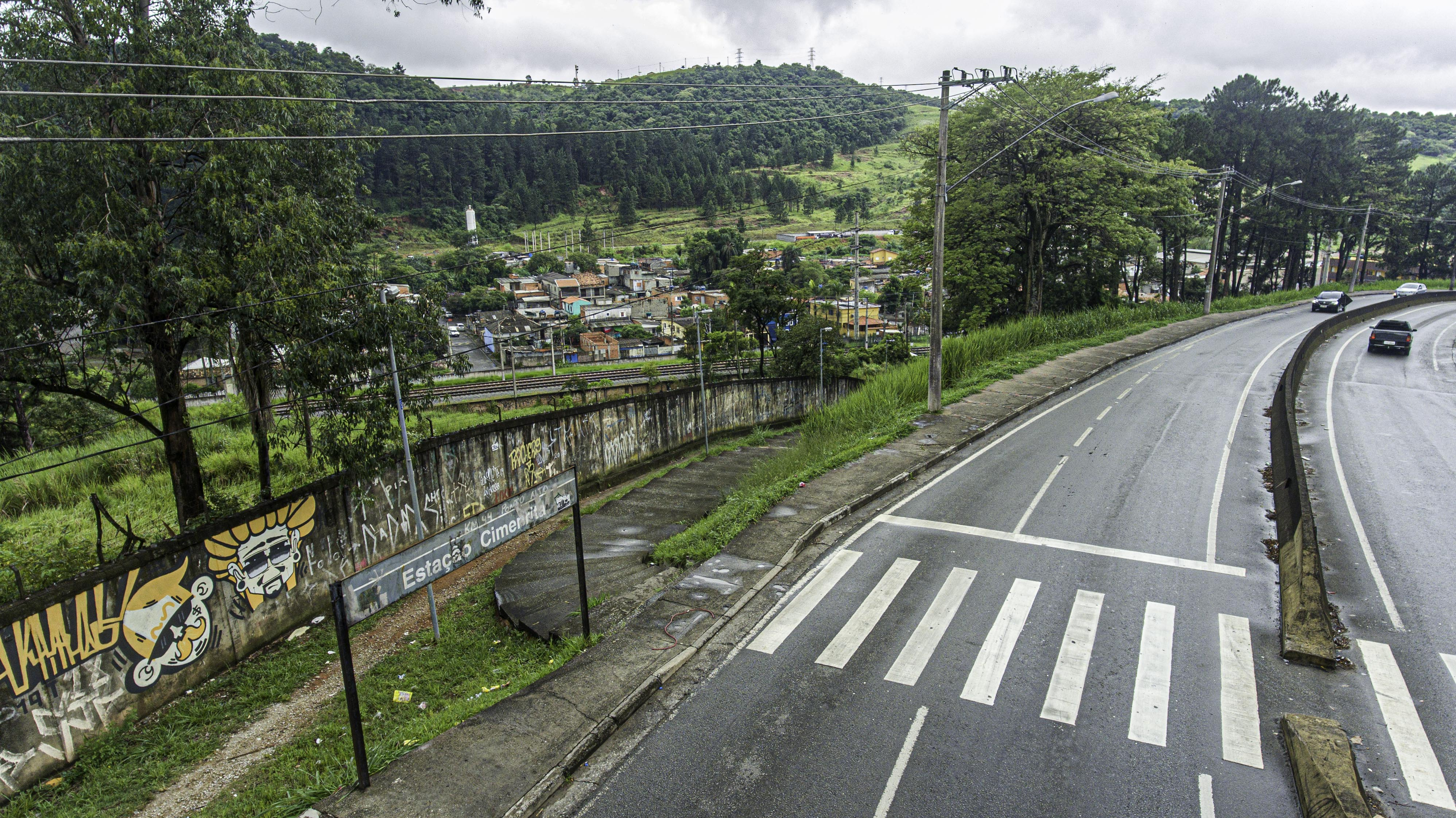
- Rodovia Renê Benedito Silva next to Cimenrita Stop in Itapevi

Route information
- Maintained by DER-SP
- Length: 29 km (18 mi)

Major junctions
- East end: Av. Batatais in Barueri next a SP-312
- SP-312 in Barueri; SP-29 in Itapevi; Raposo Tavares in São Roque
- West end: R. Luis Mateus Mailasqui in Mailasqui, São Roque next a SP-270

Location
- Country: Brazil
- State: São Paulo
- Municipalities: Barueri, Jandira, Itapevi and São Roque

Highway system
- Highways in Brazil; Federal; São Paulo State Highways
← SP-273	→ SP-275

The Rodovia Engenheiro Renê Benedito da Silva (official designation SP-274), also known as Estrada Velha de Itapevi or just Estrada Velha, is a state highway in the state of São Paulo, in Brazil.

== Route description ==
Lengths
	mi	km
Barueri	5.1	3.2
Jandira	2.5	1.6
Itapevi	13.8	8.6
São Roque	8.3	5.2
Total	29.7	18.5

The SP-274 is a highway in the state of São Paulo.with appro The highway begins at Avenida Batatais in the Vale do Sol next to SP-312, in municipality of Barueri, from there continue through Jandira and Itapevi its final point in the district of Mailasqui, in São Roque, having a junction with km54 of Rodovia Raposo Tavares (SP-270). It was named "Rodovia of Death" in 2010 between Itapevi and São Roque due to winding curves, lack of signage and serious accidents. It is administered by the Departamento de Estradas de Rodagem do Estado de São Paulo, which offers towing services, mechanical assistance, medical rescue and images available on its official website.

=== Descriptive road report ===
- km 28 (17 mi): Start at SP-312 in Barueri
- km 33,6 (20.9 mi): Barueri-Jandira Limit
- km 35,9 (22.3 mi): Jandira-Itapevi Limit
- km 39 (24 mi): Expanded Center of Itapevi
- km 40 (25 mi): Junction with Rodovia Coronel PM Nelson Tranchesi (SP-029)
- km 49,7 (30.9 mi): Itapevi-São Roque
- km 54 (34 mi): Exit to São João Novo
- km 58.3 (36.2 mi) (end in Mailasqui): Junction with Rodovia Raposo Tavares

== See also ==
- Highway system of São Paulo
- Brazilian Highway System
