= Rodovia Adhemar de Barros =

Highway in São Paulo, Brazil

SP-340
- Rodovia Adhemar de Barros
- Map of the itinerary of Adhemar de Barros Highway (in red)

Route information
- Maintained by Renovias

Major junctions
- South end: Campinas, SP
- SP-065 - Rodovia Dom Pedro I SP-107; SP-147
- North end: Mococa, SP

Location
- Country: Brazil
- State: São Paulo

Highway system
- Highways in Brazil; Federal; São Paulo State Highways

Rodovia Adhemar de Barros (official designation SP-340) is a highway in the state of São Paulo, Brazil. It is 170 km long.

The highway follows very closely in a south–north direction, departing from the city of Campinas, then passing by Jaguariúna, Holambra, Santo Antônio da Posse, Mogi Guaçu, Mogi Mirim, Estiva Gerbi, Aguaí, Casa Branca and ending at Mococa, near the border of the state of Minas Gerais.

The highway's name honours the former physician and twice Governor of the State of São Paulo, Adhemar Pereira de Barros. It is managed and maintained by a state concession to the private company Renovias, and is therefore a toll road.

== See also ==
- Highway system of São Paulo
- Brazilian Highway System
