= Bom Sucesso de Itararé =

- Municipality
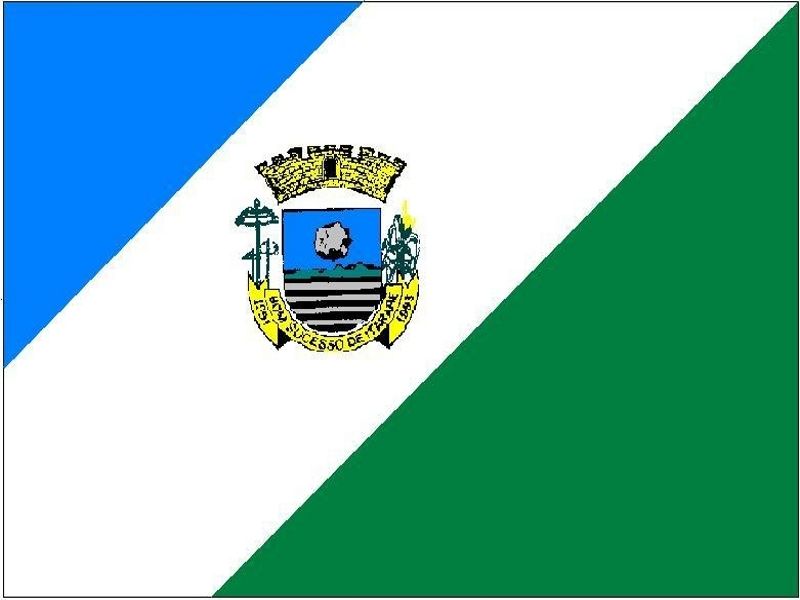
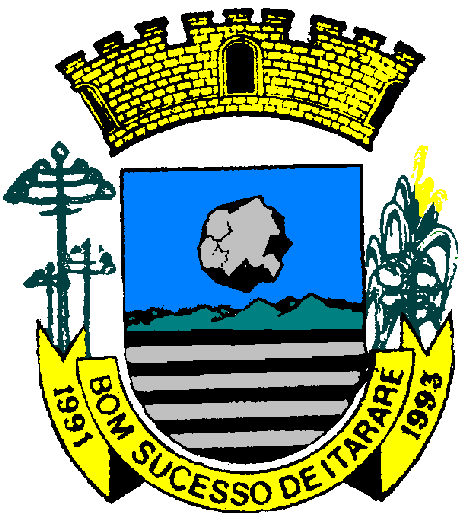
- Flag Coat of arms

- Location of Bom Sucesso de Itararé within the State of São Paulo

- Location of Bom Sucesso de Itararé within Brazil
- Coordinates: 24°19′04″S 49°08′38″W
- Country: Brazil
- State: São Paulo
- Mesoregion: Itapetininga
- Microregion: Itapeva
- Established: October 27, 1991

Government
  - Mayor: Dirceu Pacheco de Oliveira (2009–2012) (PSDB)

Area
  - Total: 133.578 km^{2} (51.575 sq mi)
- Elevation: 950 m (3,120 ft)

Population (2020)
  - Total: 3,984
  - Density: 29.83/km^{2} (77.25/sq mi)
- Time zone: UTC−3 (BRT)

Bom Sucesso de Itararé is a municipality in the Brazilian state of São Paulo. Its population in 2020 was 3,984 and its area is 133.578 square kilometres (51.575 sq mi). It is located at an elevation of 950 metres (3,120 ft).

== History ==
The municipality of Bom Sucesso de Itararé was established in 1991, when it was separated from Itararé.

== Geography ==
Bom Sucesso de Itararé is located in the southern-subtropical part of Brazil, at 24 degrees, 19 minutes, 4 second south, and 49 degrees, 8 minutes, 38 seconds west, at an altitude of 950 metres (3,120 ft), in the internal part of the State of São Paulo. It covers an area of 133.578 square kilometres (51.575 sq mi).

Rivers

- Itararé River
- Verde River
- Pirituba River

== Demographics ==
Historical population (municipality)
| Year | Population | %± |
|---|---|---|
| 2000 | 3,231 | — |
| 2010 | 3,571 | 10.5% |
| 2022 | 3,555 | −0.4% |

2000 Census figures

Total population: 3,231

- Urban: 1,954
- Rural: 1,277
- Men: 1,669
- Women: 1,562

Density (inhabitants/km^{2}): 24.26
Infant mortality up to 1 year old (per thousand): 29.51
Life expectancy (years): 65.20
Fertility rate (children per woman): 3.40
Literacy rate: 85.82%
Human Development Index (HDI): 0.693

- Income: 0.603
- Longevity: 0.670
- Education: 0,805

== Government ==
- Mayor: Dirceu Pacheco de Oliveira (PSDB) (2009–2012)

== Economy ==
The economy of Bom Sucesso de Itararé is based on ranching and mining industry. Its first mine opened in 1949.

== Transport ==
The first road linked Bom Sucesso to Itararé. A second road was opened in 1948 and linked it to Itapeva.

- SP-258 state highway

== Media ==
In telecommunications, the city was served by Telecomunicações de São Paulo. In July 1998, this company was acquired by Telefónica, which adopted the Vivo brand in 2012. The company is currently an operator of cell phones, fixed lines, internet (fiber optics/4G) and television (satellite and cable).

== See also ==
- List of municipalities in São Paulo
