= Medrado =

Medrado may refer to:

People

- Deborah Medrado (born 2002), Brazil rhythmic gymnast
- Patricia Medrado (born 1956), Brazilian tennis player

Places

- Elísio Medrado, municipality in the North-East of Brazil
