= SP303 =

SP-303 may refer to:

- SP-303 (Brazil), a highway in Brazil
- Boss SP-303, a digital sampler
- USS George P. Squires (SP-303), a U.S. Navy patrol vessel and minesweeper
