= SP8 =

SP8 may refer to:

- 11980 Ellis (1995 SP8), a Main-belt Asteroid discovered on September 17, 1995
- The Sp8 transcription factor gene or its protein product

SP-8 may refer to:

- SP-8 (Brazil), a state highway in the state of São Paulo, Brazil
- USS Patrol No. 4 (SP-8), an armed motorboat that served in the United States Navy as a patrol vessel from 1917 to 1919
