= SP-250 (São Paulo highway) =

State highway in São Paulo, Brazil

Rodovia Bunjiro Nakao, Rodovia José de Carvalho, Rodovia Nestor Fogaça, Rodovia Aparício de Oliveira Terra, Rodovia Sebastião Ferraz de Camargo Penteado.

Route information
- Maintained by DER
- Length: 309 km (192 mi)

Major junctions
- North end: Vargem Grande Paulista next to Cotia
- Raposo Tavares SP-79 SP-249 BR-373
- South end: Ribeira

Location
- Country: Brazil
- State: São Paulo

Highway system
- Highways in Brazil; Federal

SP-250 is a state highway in the state of São Paulo in Brazil.
