= SP-306 (São Paulo highway) =

Highway in São Paulo, Brazil

SP-306

Route information
- Length: 47.520 km (29.528 mi)

Location
- Country: Brazil
- State: São Paulo

Highway system
- Highways in Brazil; Federal; São Paulo State Highways

SP-306 is a state highway in the state of São Paulo in Brazil.
