= Faria Lima =

Faria Lima may refer to:

- José Vicente Faria Lima (1909–1969), Brazilian military engineer and politician
- Brigadeiro Faria Lima Avenue, a street in São Paulo, Brazil
- Rodovia Brigadeiro Faria Lima, a highway in the state of São Paulo, Brazil
- Faria Lima (São Paulo Metro), a railway station in São Paulo, Brazil
