= Varpa, São Paulo =

Varpa Vārpa (Latvian)
- District of Tupã
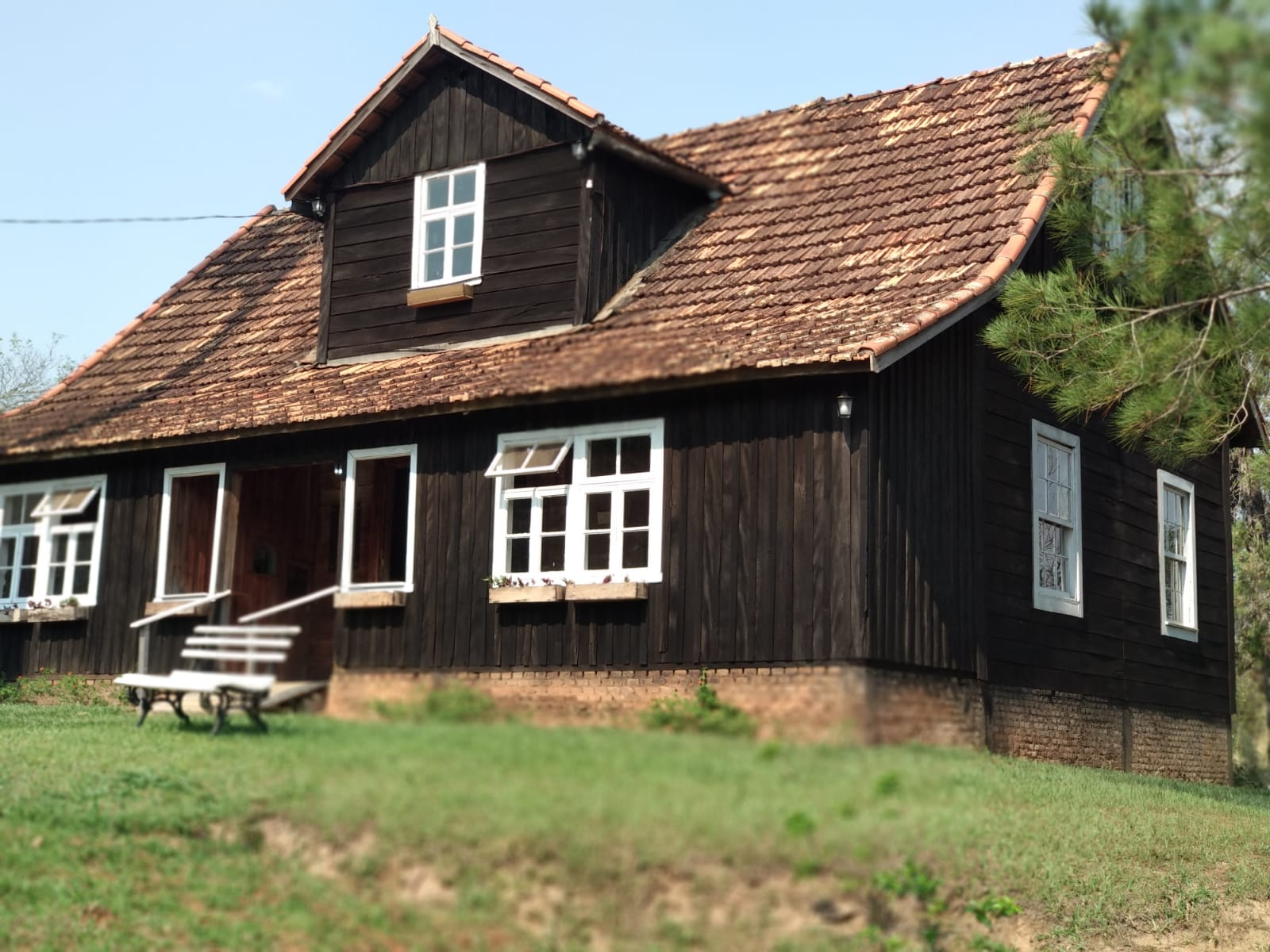
- Fazenda Palma
- Interactive map of Varpa
- Coordinates: 22°04′49″S 50°32′25″W
- Country: Brazil
- State: São Paulo
- Municipality: Tupã
- Created: 23 December 1927

Area
  - Total: 53.579 km^{2} (20.687 sq mi)

Population (2010)
  - Total: 631
- Time zone: UTC−3 (BRT)

Varpa (Latvian: Vārpa) is a district of the municipality of Tupã, in the interior of the state of São Paulo, Brazil.

== History ==
=== Origins and settlement ===
Varpa was colonized by immigrants from Latvia, a European country on the Baltic Sea. Most of the Latvian immigrants arrived after the First World War, leaving Latvia for Brazil in response to restrictions on freedom of worship imposed under the Bolshevik regime. The settlers were predominantly Baptists.

The immigrants arrived from Europe at the Port of Santos. After travelling for 22 hours on the Estrada de Ferro Sorocabana, they disembarked at the railway station of Sapezal, now in the municipality of Paraguaçu Paulista, and walked 31 kilometres through the forest to reach the colony.

The first settlers arrived to purchase land and established themselves on the right bank of the Rio do Peixe in November 1922. There they founded the colony of Varpa and the Evangelical Corporation Palma, now known as Fazenda Palma, in the then municipality of Campos Novos. More than 2,400 Latvian immigrants later took part in the cooperative settlement. They cleared the forest, built houses with European-style architecture and developed a largely self-sufficient community, including an electric system powered by a local waterfall.

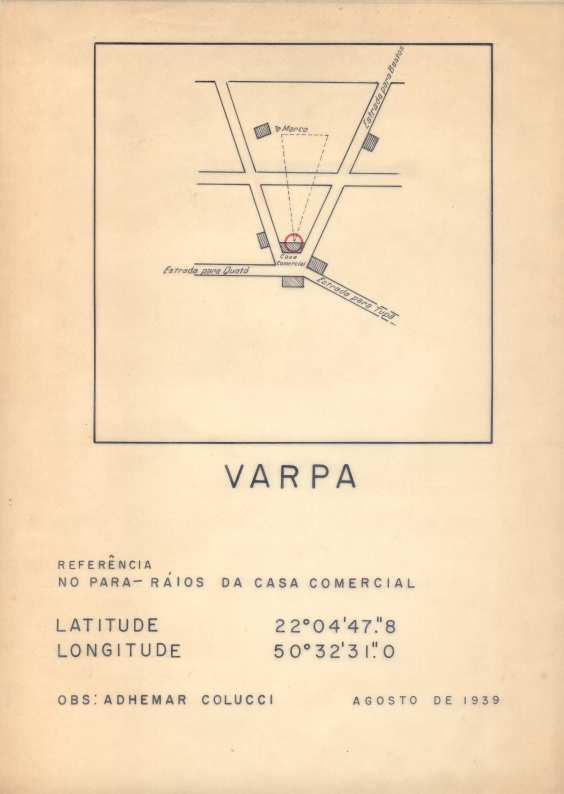
Sketch of the original urban area

The settlers built a Baptist church with seating for more than 1,000 people, reportedly one of the largest in South America at the time. Latvian was the main language of the community, and education was provided by teachers from within the settlement. Portuguese was taught only to a limited extent.

In 1925, three years after the beginning of colonization, the Municipal Council of Campos Novos requested that Varpa be elevated to the category of district. Varpa reached its peak during the second half of the 1920s and the 1930s.

=== Decline ===
The immigrants living in Varpa spoke only Latvian until the Estado Novo government established an official primary school in 1934 and required the use of Portuguese. After the community's self-sufficient peak, the creation of the city of Tupã, the arrival of the western trunk line of the Companhia Paulista de Estradas de Ferro at the municipal seat in 1941, and the lack of professional and educational opportunities led many people to leave the district in subsequent decades.

== Toponymy ==
The Latvian name vārpa means "ear of grain". The name referred to the idea that other units would be connected to the main colony, like the grains of an ear.

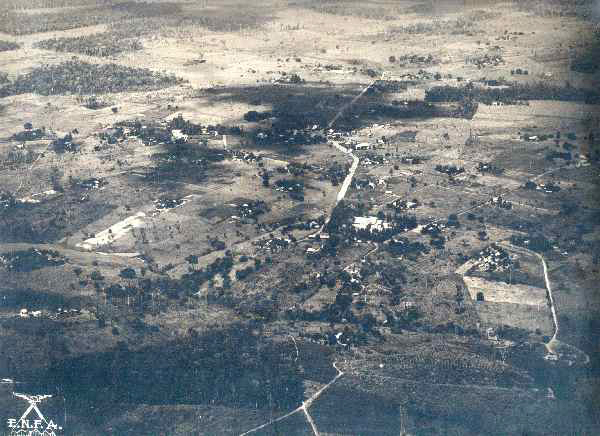
Aerial view of Varpa in the 1940s.

== Administrative history ==
- The police district of Varpa was created on 27 November 1925 in the municipality of Campos Novos.
- The district was created by Law No. 2,237 of 23 December 1927, with its seat in the settlement of the same name, in the municipality of Campos Novos.
- By Decree No. 6,204 of 11 December 1933, it was transferred to the municipality of Marília.
- By Law No. 2,620 of 14 January 1936, it lost territory for the formation of the district of Bastos.
- By Decree No. 9,775 of 30 November 1938, it was transferred to the municipality of Pompeia.
- By Decree-Law No. 14,334 of 30 November 1944, it was transferred to the municipality of Tupã.

== Geography ==
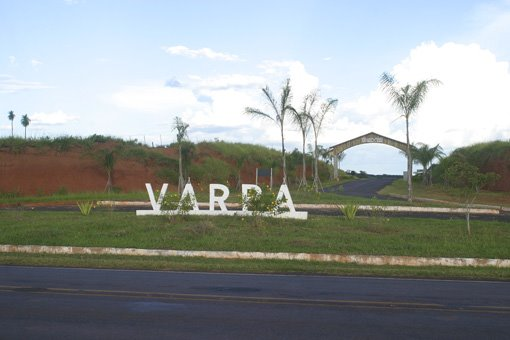
Entrance to the district on the Quatá–Tupã road.

Varpa's main access route is the Quatá–Tupã road. The district is also connected by the Varpa–Herculândia local road. Both roads are accessed from Rodovia Comandante João Ribeiro de Barros (SP-294).

== Demographics ==
According to the 2010 census of the Brazilian Institute of Geography and Statistics (IBGE), Varpa had a total population of 631 inhabitants. The district has an area of 53.579 km².

Urban population
| Census year | Population | Change |
|---|---|---|
| 1934 | 1,228 | — |
| 1940 | 213 | −82.7% |
| 1950 | 200 | −6.1% |
| 1960 | 420 | 110.0% |
| 1970 | 273 | −35.0% |
| 1980 | 390 | 42.9% |
| 1991 | 455 | 16.7% |
| 2000 | 482 | 5.9% |
| 2010 | 422 | −12.4% |

== Public services ==
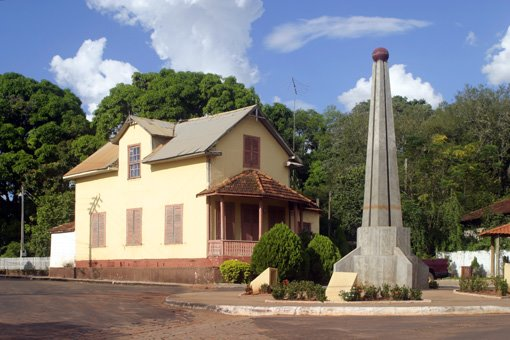
Central square of Varpa.

Civil registration is carried out in the district, where the local civil registry office remains active.

Water supply is provided by Sabesp. The Varpa supply system uses disinfection and fluoridation, with wells P-1 and P-2 as sources. Electricity is supplied by Energisa Sul-Sudeste, formerly Vale Paranapanema.

== Tourism and culture ==
=== Museu dos Pioneiros ===
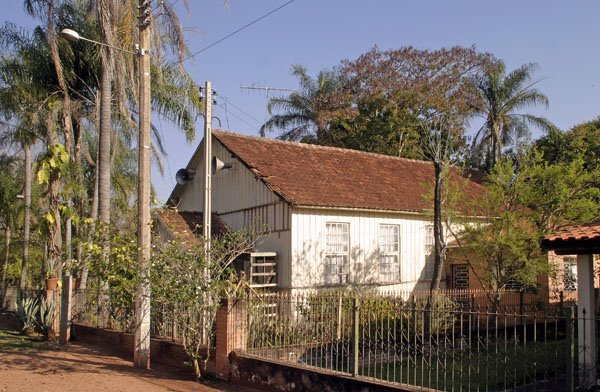
Museu dos Pioneiros "Janis Erdbergs".

Many inhabitants of Varpa preserve elements of Latvian culture. In addition to homemade food products and typical architecture, the district is home to the Museu dos Pioneiros "Janis Erdbergs", which contains a catalogued collection related to the settlement's early history. The museum is maintained by the municipality.

=== Fazenda Palma ===
Varpa is also known for ecotourism, especially at Fazenda Palma. Local tourism activities include canoeing, camping and visits to waterfalls.

== See also ==
- Tupã, São Paulo
