= Rodovia Cândido Portinari =

Highway in Sao Paulo state, Brazil

SP-334
- Rodovia Cândido Portinari

Major junctions
- South end: Ribeirão Preto, SP
- North end: Rifaina, SP

Location
- Country: Brazil
- State: São Paulo

Highway system
- Highways in Brazil; Federal; São Paulo State Highways

Rodovia Cândido Portinari (official designation SP-334) is a State highway in the state of São Paulo. It is named after Cândido Portinari, a noted painter, who was born in the city of Brodowski.

The highway runs through these locations:

- Ribeirão Preto (where it starts at SP-330)
- Brodowski
- Batatais
- Franca - near Rifaina (division of Minas Gerais which links with another state highway)

== See also ==
- Highway system of São Paulo
- List of state highways in São Paulo
