= SP350 =

SP-350 may refer to:

- SP-350 Denise, a small submarine designed to hold two people capable of exploring depths of up to 400 metres invented by Jacques-Yves Cousteau
- SP-350 (Brazil), a State highway in Brazil
- Olympus SP-350, 8-megapixel compact digital camera
- USS Roselle (SP-350), a ship that served both as a tug and as minesweeper
