= Rodovia Régis Bittencourt =

Highway in Brazil

BR-116
- Rodovia Régis Bittencourt
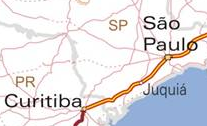

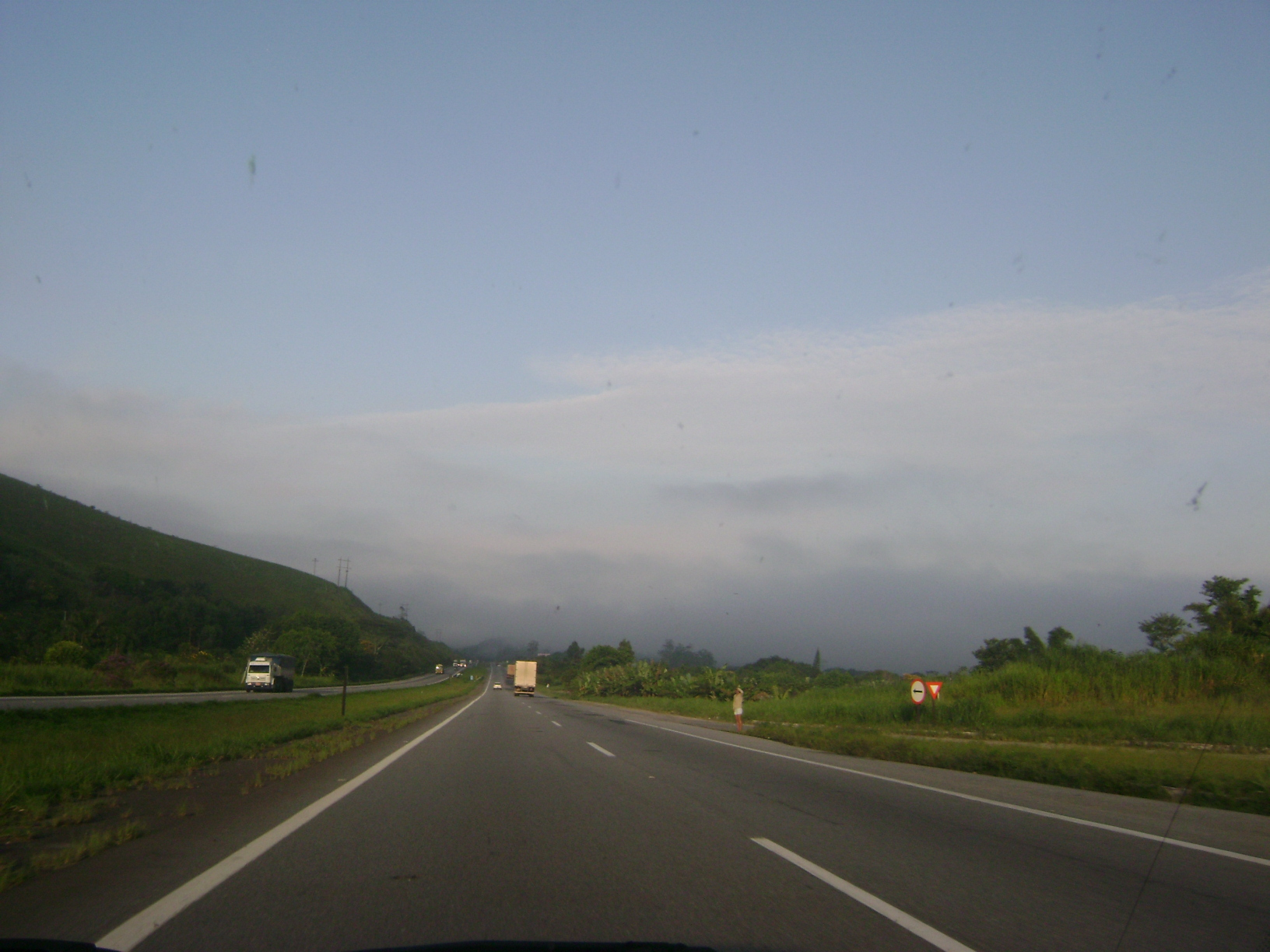
- Rodovia Régis Bittencourt in Registro

Route information
- Maintained by Autopista Régis Bittencourt (OHL) (since 2008)
- Length: 496 km (308 mi)
- Existed: 24 January 1961; 65 years ago–present

Major junctions
- North end: Largo do Taboão in Taboão da Serra, SP
- SP-21 (Rodoanel Mário Covas); SP-55; SP-79; SP-165; SP-226; SP-222
- South end: Rodovia Via Serrana in Rio Negro, PR

Location
- Country: Brazil
- States: São Paulo, Paraná

Highway system
- BR-116
← BR-116	→ BR-116

The Rodovia Régis Bittencourt is a section of the BR-116 that connects the cities of Taboão da Serra and Curitiba, Paraná. It is considered one of the most dangerous highways of Brazil, due to the high number of crashes. It also leads the number of ambiental crashes in the state of São Paulo.

== Duplication ==
The Régis Bittencourt was, for the most part, duplicated around the year 2000. However, there was a stretch on a simple track, 19 km long, in the mountain region between Miracatu and Juquitiba, called Serra do Cafezal, in the state of São Paulo. In this stretch, the heavy traffic of heavy cargo vehicles (corresponding to up to 60% of the total), the rugged topography and poor conservation, have been causing increasing traffic jams and fatal crashes, being one of the highways with the highest rate of crashes with fatalities.

As of 2008, long negotiations dragged on between the concessionaire and IBAMA on the route with the least environmental impact and the lowest cost of carrying out the duplication of the most rugged topography stretch the Serra do Cafezal, until the final project was released. After protests by the Brazilian population, the concessionaire began the duplication works of the Serra do Cafezal, also known as "Serra dos 90", in 2010. The first duplicated sections were partially delivered between 2012 and 2015. The works were fully concluded in December 2017, after bureaucratic obstacles involving environmental licenses.

== Photos ==
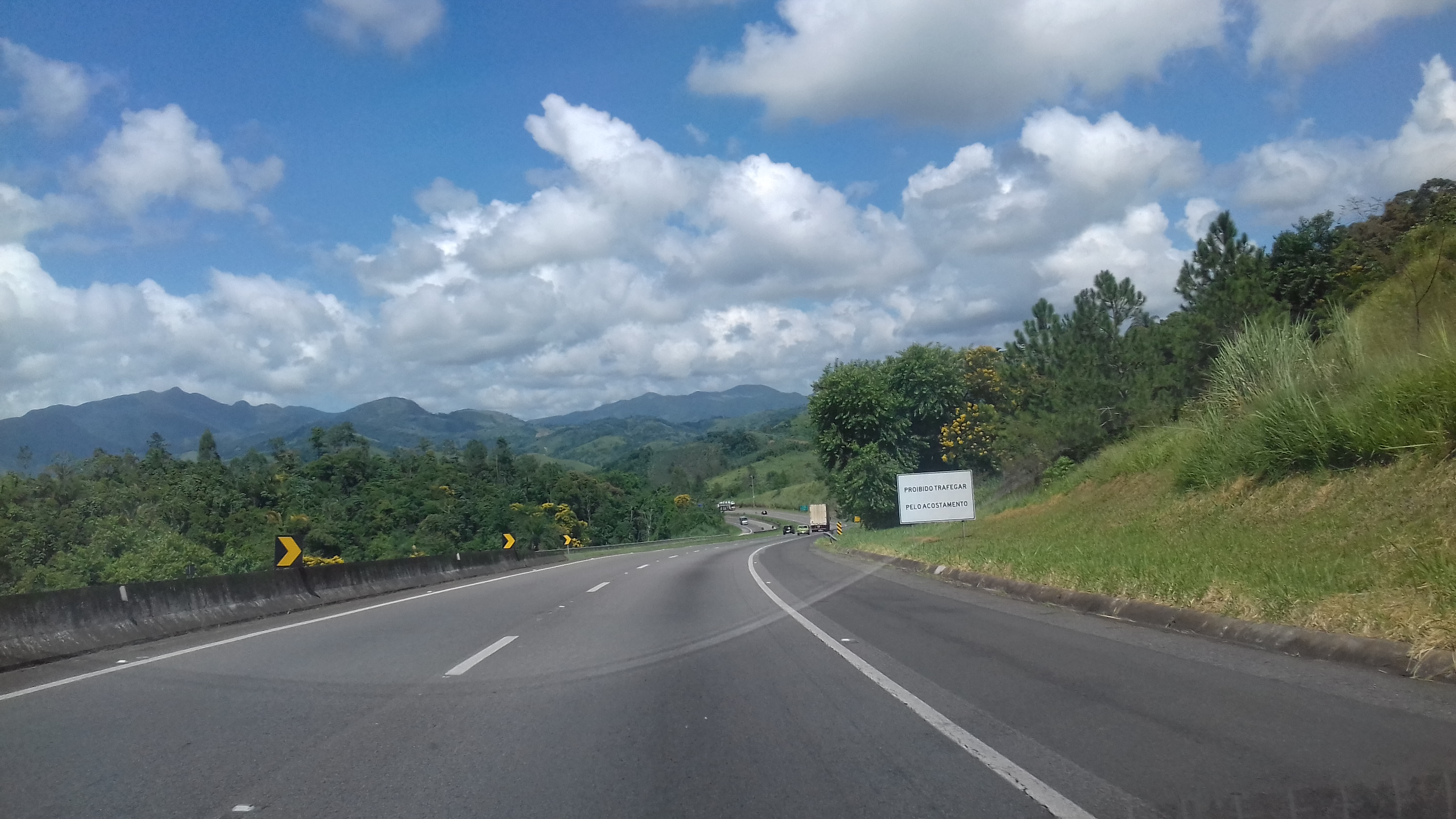
Régis Bittencourt Highway at Cajati, São Paulo, Brazil.

== See also ==
- Highway system of São Paulo
- Brazilian Highway System
