= SP-95 =

SP-95 may refer to:

- SP-95 (Brazil), a state highway
- Technoavia SP-95, a Russian aerobatic aircraft
- USS Katydid (SP-95), a U.S. patrol vessel 1917–1919
