= SP-353 (São Paulo highway) =

State highway in São Paulo, Brazil

SP-353

Route information
- Length: 16.370 km (10.172 mi)

Location
- Country: Brazil
- State: São Paulo

Highway system
- Highways in Brazil; Federal; São Paulo State Highways

SP-353 is a state highway in the state of São Paulo in Brazil. The highway connects with SP-326 at Terra Roxa.
