= Rodovia Luís de Queiróz =

Highway in São Paulo

SP-304
- Rodovia Luiz de Queiroz
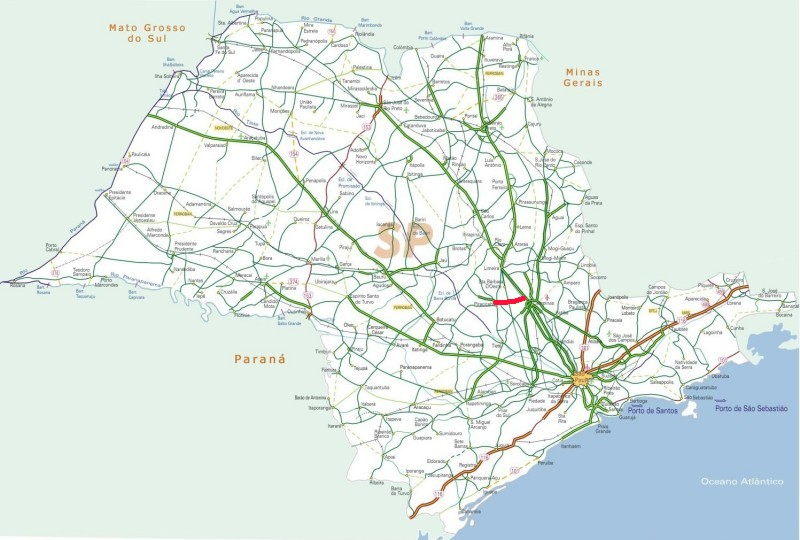
- Itinerary map of Rodovia Luiz de Queiroz (in red)

Route information
- Maintained by the Department of Roads of the State of São Paulo (DER)
- Length: 45 km (28 mi)

Major junctions
- East end: Rodovia Anhanguera in Americana, SP
- SP-330 (Rodovia Anhanguera); SP-348 (Rodovia dos Bandeirantes); SP-306 (Rodovia Luís Ometto); SP-306 (Rodovia Com. Américo E. Romi); SP-135; SP-308
- West end: Av. Pádua Dias in Piracicaba, SP

Location
- Country: Brazil
- State: São Paulo

Highway system
- Highways in Brazil; Federal; São Paulo State Highways

The Rodovia Luiz de Queirós (official designation SP-304) is a highway in the state of São Paulo, Brazil.

SP-304 interconnects the cities of Americana, by the Anhanguera Highway (SP-330) and Piracicaba, serving also the city of Santa Bárbara d'Oeste, at which level crosses with the Rodovia dos Bandeirantes (SP-348).

It has been named in honour of Luís Vicente de Sousa Queirós, a farmer and agriculturist who founded in Piracicaba the first practical school of agriculture in the state, which later became a college of the University of São Paulo.

== See also ==
- Highway system of São Paulo
- Brazilian Highway System
