= Józef Brodowski =

Józef Brodowski may refer to:

- Józef Brodowski the Elder (c. 1775/81–1853), Polish painter
- Józef Brodowski the Younger (1828–1900), Polish painter, son of Antoni Brodowski

== See also ==
- Brodowski
