= SP-151 (São Paulo highway) =

Highway in the São Paulo state

SP-151

Route information
- Length: 15.600 km (9.693 mi)

Location
- Country: Brazil
- State: São Paulo

Highway system
- Highways in Brazil; Federal; São Paulo State Highways

SP-151 is a state highway in the state of São Paulo in Brazil.
