= SP-122 (São Paulo highway) =

São Paulo State highway

SP-122

Route information
- Length: 15.900 km (9.880 mi)

Location
- Country: Brazil
- State: São Paulo

Highway system
- Highways in Brazil; Federal; São Paulo State Highways

SP-122 is a state highway in the state of São Paulo in Brazil.
