= SP-73 (São Paulo highway) =

State highway in São Paulo, Brazil

SP-073

Route information
- Length: 41.050 km (25.507 mi)

Location
- Country: Brazil
- State: São Paulo

Highway system
- Highways in Brazil; Federal; São Paulo State Highways

The SP-73 is a highway in the southeastern part of the state of São Paulo in Brazil. The highway is known as the Lix da Cunha which begins with the SP-330 in Campinas all the way to SP-75 in Indaiatuba.
