= SP-197 (São Paulo highway) =

State highway in Brazil

SP-197

Route information
- Length: 20.020 km (12.440 mi)

Location
- Country: Brazil
- State: São Paulo

Highway system
- Highways in Brazil; Federal; São Paulo State Highways

SP-197 is a state highway in the state of São Paulo in Brazil. It connects Brotas with Torrinha.
