= SP-253 (São Paulo highway) =

State highway in São Paulo, Brazil

SP-253

Route information
- Length: 221.690 km (137.752 mi)

Location
- Country: Brazil
- State: São Paulo

Highway system
- Highways in Brazil; Federal; São Paulo State Highways

SP-253 is a state highway in the state of São Paulo in Brazil.
