= SP-321 (São Paulo highway) =

State highway in Brazil

SP-321

Route information
- Length: 146.800 km (91.217 mi)

Location
- Country: Brazil
- State: São Paulo

Highway system
- Highways in Brazil; Federal; São Paulo State Highways

SP-321 is a state highway in the state of São Paulo in Brazil.
