= SP-323 (São Paulo highway) =

State highway in Brazil

SP-323

Route information
- Length: 44.100 km (27.402 mi)

Location
- Country: Brazil
- State: São Paulo

Highway system
- Highways in Brazil; Federal; São Paulo State Highways

SP-323 is a state highway in the state of São Paulo in Brazil.
