= SP-103 (São Paulo highway) =

Highway in São Paulo, Brazil

SP-103

Route information
- Length: 32.7 km (20.3 mi)

Location
- Country: Brazil
- State: São Paulo

Highway system
- Highways in Brazil; Federal; São Paulo State Highways

SP-103 is a state highway in the state of São Paulo in Brazil.
