= SP-181 (São Paulo highway) =

São Paulo state highway

SP-181

Route information
- Length: 19.030 km (11.825 mi)

Location
- Country: Brazil
- State: São Paulo

Highway system
- Highways in Brazil; Federal; São Paulo State Highways

SP-181 is a state highway in the state of São Paulo in Brazil.

== Denominations ==
It receives the following names along its route:

Name: João Pereira dos Santos Filho, Highway

- From - to: Sumidouro - Capão Bonito
- Legislation: DEC. 16.684 OF 02/26/81

== Description ==
Main points of passage: SP 250 (Capão Bonito) - Sumidouro
