= SP-355 (São Paulo highway) =

State highway

SP-355

Route information
- Length: 45.764 km (28.436 mi)

Location
- Country: Brazil
- State: São Paulo

Highway system
- Highways in Brazil; Federal; São Paulo State Highways

SP-355 is a state highway in the state of São Paulo in Brazil.
