= SP-54 (São Paulo highway) =

São Paulo state Highway

SP-054

Route information
- Length: 13.000 km (8.078 mi)

Location
- Country: Brazil
- State: São Paulo

Highway system
- Highways in Brazil; Federal; São Paulo State Highways

SP-54 is a highway in the northeastern part of the state of São Paulo in Brazil. The highway is known as the João Batista de Mello Souza for its entire length. The highway runs from the city of the Rodovia Presidente Dutra (BR-116) up to the state boundary with Rio de Janeiro.
