= SP-322 (São Paulo highway) =

State highway in São Paulo, Brazil

SP-322

Route information
- Length: 295.410 km (183.559 mi)

Location
- Country: Brazil
- State: São Paulo

Highway system
- Highways in Brazil; Federal; São Paulo State Highways

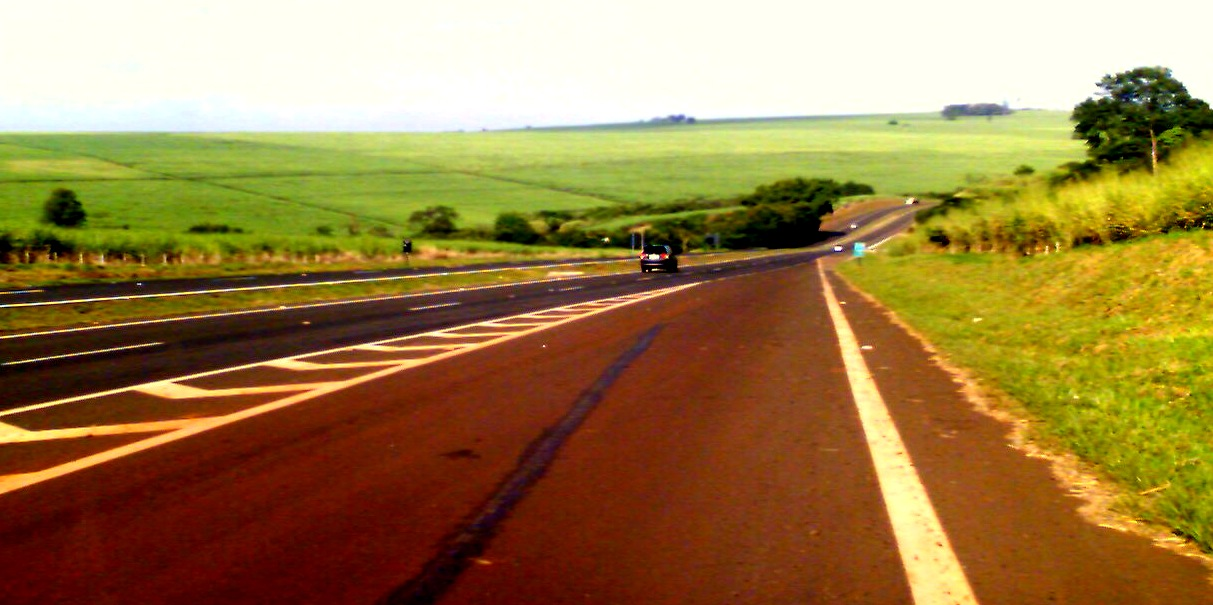
SP-322 in a stretch near Sertãozinho.

Rodovia Attilio Balbo (officially designated SP-322) is a highway in the state of São Paulo, Brazil, which starts in the city of Ribeirão Preto and finishes at the city of Bebedouro. Two other important cities served by the highway are Sertãozinho and Jaboticabal. The name of its first stretch, between Ribeirão Preto and Sertãozinho, honors Italian Brazilian Attilio Balbo, a pioneer farmer and industrialist in the area of sugarcane, sugar and alcohol. The second stretch, from Sertãozinho to Bebedouro, has been named after Armando Salles de Oliveira, a former state governor of São Paulo. São Paulo, Brazil's vibrant financial center, is among the world's most populous cities, with numerous cultural institutions and a rich architectural tradition. Its iconic buildings range from its neo-Gothic cathedral and the 1929 Martinelli skyscraper to modernist architect Oscar Niemeyer's curvy Edifício Copan. The colonial-style Pátio do Colégio church marks where Jesuit priests founded the city in 1554.
