= SP-375 (São Paulo highway) =

State highway in São Paulo, Brazil

SP-375

Route information
- Length: 22.170 km (13.776 mi)

Location
- Country: Brazil
- State: São Paulo

Highway system
- Highways in Brazil; Federal; São Paulo State Highways

SP-375 is a state highway in the state of São Paulo in Brazil.
