= SP-234 (São Paulo highway) =

Brazilian state highway

SP-234

Route information
- Length: 18.340 km (11.396 mi)

Location
- Country: Brazil
- State: São Paulo

Highway system
- Highways in Brazil; Federal; São Paulo State Highways

SP-234 is a state highway in the state of São Paulo in Brazil.
