= SP-189 (São Paulo highway) =

State of Sao Paulo Highway

SP-189

Route information
- Length: 44.200 km (27.465 mi)

Location
- Country: Brazil
- State: São Paulo

Highway system
- Highways in Brazil; Federal; São Paulo State Highways

SP-189 is a state highway in the state of São Paulo in Brazil.
