= SP-41 (São Paulo highway) =

State highway in São Paulo, Brazil

SP-041

Location
- Country: Brazil
- State: São Paulo

Highway system
- Highways in Brazil; Federal; São Paulo State Highways

The Rodovia Perito Criminal Engenheiro Antonio Carlos Moraes (SP-041, also known as Planalto Interlink) is a state highway on the state of São Paulo in Brazil.
