= SP-271 (São Paulo highway) =

Highway system in Brazil

SP-271

Route information
- Length: 21.760 km (13.521 mi)

Location
- Country: Brazil
- State: São Paulo

Highway system
- Highways in Brazil; Federal; São Paulo State Highways

SP-271 is a state highway in the state of São Paulo in Brazil.
