= SP-216 (São Paulo highway) =

State highway in Brazil

SP-216

Route information
- Length: 97.600 km (60.646 mi)

Location
- Country: Brazil
- State: São Paulo

Highway system
- Highways in Brazil; Federal; São Paulo State Highways

SP-216 is a state highway in the state of São Paulo in Brazil.
