= SP-139 (São Paulo highway) =

Road in Brazil

SP-139

Route information
- Length: 121.420 km (75.447 mi)

Location
- Country: Brazil
- State: São Paulo

Highway system
- Highways in Brazil; Federal; São Paulo State Highways

SP-139 is a state highway in the state of São Paulo in Brazil.
