= SP-77 (São Paulo highway) =

State highway in São Paulo state, Brazil

SP-077

Route information
- Length: 40.000 km (24.855 mi)

Location
- Country: Brazil
- State: São Paulo

Highway system
- Highways in Brazil; Federal; São Paulo State Highways

The SP-77 is a highway in the southeastern part of the state of São Paulo in Brazil. The highway is known as Nilo Maximo for its entire length and begins within Jacareí, runs through Santa Branca and ends in Salesópolis.
