= SP-121 (São Paulo highway) =

Highway in the state of São Paulo

SP-121

Route information
- Length: 34.450 km (21.406 mi)

Location
- Country: Brazil
- State: São Paulo

Highway system
- Highways in Brazil; Federal; São Paulo State Highways

SP-121 is a state highway in the state of São Paulo in Brazil.
