= SP-385 (São Paulo highway) =

Brazilian highway

SP-385

Route information
- Length: 30.000 km (18.641 mi)

Location
- Country: Brazil
- State: São Paulo

Highway system
- Highways in Brazil; Federal; São Paulo State Highways

SP-385 is a state highway in the state of São Paulo in Brazil.
