= SP-23 (São Paulo highway) =

State highway in São Paulo, Brazil

SP-023

Route information
- Length: 19.320 km (12.005 mi)

Location
- Country: Brazil
- State: São Paulo

Highway system
- Highways in Brazil; Federal; São Paulo State Highways

SP-23 is a state highway in the state of São Paulo in Brazil.

== Names ==
It receives the following official names along its route:

Name: Luiz Salomão Chamma, Mayor, Highway

- From – to: Mairiporã – Franco da Rocha
- Legislation: LAW 9.393 OF 10/16/1996

== Description ==
Main points along the route: SP-332 - Franco da Rocha - Mairiporã - BR-381

== Characteristics ==
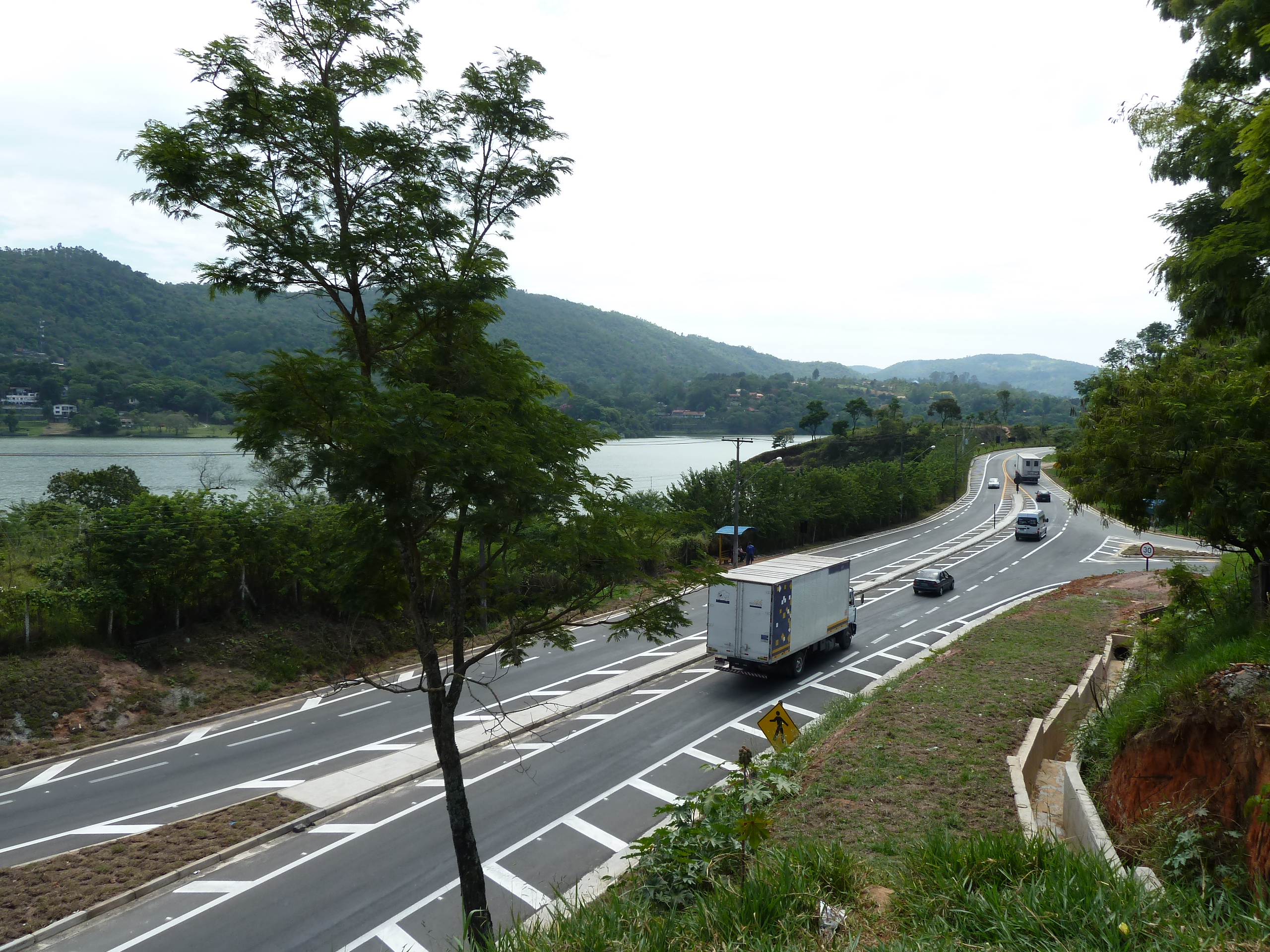
Section of SP-23 in Mairiporã.

=== Length ===
- Initial km: 37.200
- Final km: 56.520

=== Municipalities served ===
- Franco da Rocha
- Mairiporã
