= SP-331 (São Paulo highway) =

State highway in São Paulo, Brazil

SP-331

Route information
- Length: 206.352 km (128.221 mi)

Location
- Country: Brazil
- State: São Paulo

Highway system
- Highways in Brazil; Federal; São Paulo State Highways

SP-331 is a state highway in the state of São Paulo in Brazil.
