= Rodovia Ariovaldo de Almeida Viana =

Highway in São Paulo, Brazil

SP-061 Rodovia Ariovaldo de Almeida Viana
- Rodovia Guarujá-Bertioga; Estrada de Pernambuco

Route information
- Length: 21 km (13 mi)

Major junctions
- North end: Ferry from Guarujá to Bertioga in Guarujá, SP
- South end: Avenida Marjory da Silva Prado in Guarujá, SP

Location
- Country: Brazil
- State: São Paulo

Highway system
- Highways in Brazil; Federal

Rodovia Ariovaldo de Almeida Viana (SP-61) is a highway in the southeastern part of the state of São Paulo in Brazil. The highway begins in the urban area of Guarujá and passes through the municipality of Bertioga, and links Mogi das Cruzes with the Rodovia Dom Paulo Rolim Loreiro, SP-98. It's also known as Rodovia Guarujá-Bertioga and Estrada de Pernambuco.
