= SP-352 (São Paulo highway) =

State highway in São Paulo, Brazil

SP-352

Route information
- Length: 51.770 km (32.168 mi)

Location
- Country: Brazil
- State: São Paulo

Highway system
- Highways in Brazil; Federal; São Paulo State Highways

SP-352 is a state highway in the state of São Paulo in Brazil.
