= SP-167 (São Paulo highway) =

State highway in São Paulo, Brazil

SP-167

Route information
- Length: 9.720 km (6.040 mi)

Location
- Country: Brazil
- State: São Paulo

Highway system
- Highways in Brazil; Federal; São Paulo State Highways

SP-167 is a state highway in the state of São Paulo in Brazil.
