= SP-64 (São Paulo highway) =

State highway in São Paulo, Brazil

SP-064

Route information
- Length: 9.700 km (6.027 mi)

Location
- Country: Brazil
- State: São Paulo

Highway system
- Highways in Brazil; Federal; São Paulo State Highways

The SP-64 is a highway in the southeastern part of the state of São Paulo in Brazil. The highway name is the Rodovia do Resgate and runs from Bananal up to the state of Rio de Janeiro.
