= SP-427 (São Paulo highway) =

State highway in São Paulo, Brazil

SP-427

Route information
- Length: 22.981 km (14.280 mi)

Location
- Country: Brazil
- State: São Paulo

Highway system
- Highways in Brazil; Federal; São Paulo State Highways

SP-427 is a state highway in the state of São Paulo, Brazil. It begins in São José do Rio Preto and ends in Mirassolândia, in a length of 25 km.
