= SP-92 (São Paulo highway) =

State highway in São Paulo, Brazil

SP-092

Route information
- Length: 19.760 km (12.278 mi)

Location
- Country: Brazil
- State: São Paulo

Highway system
- Highways in Brazil; Federal; São Paulo State Highways

SP-92 is a state highway in the state of São Paulo in Brazil.
