= SP-317 (São Paulo highway) =

Highway

SP-317

Route information
- Length: 22.000 km (13.670 mi)

Location
- Country: Brazil
- State: São Paulo

Highway system
- Highways in Brazil; Federal; São Paulo State Highways

SP-317 is a state highway in the state of São Paulo in Brazil.
