= SP-247 (São Paulo highway) =

State highway in São Paulo, Brazil

SP-247

Route information
- Length: 35.000 km (21.748 mi)

Location
- Country: Brazil
- State: São Paulo

Highway system
- Highways in Brazil; Federal; São Paulo State Highways

SP-247 is a state highway in the state of São Paulo in Brazil.

== Description ==
Main points of passage: SP-068 (Bananal) – Sertão da Bocaina – RJ border

== Characteristics ==
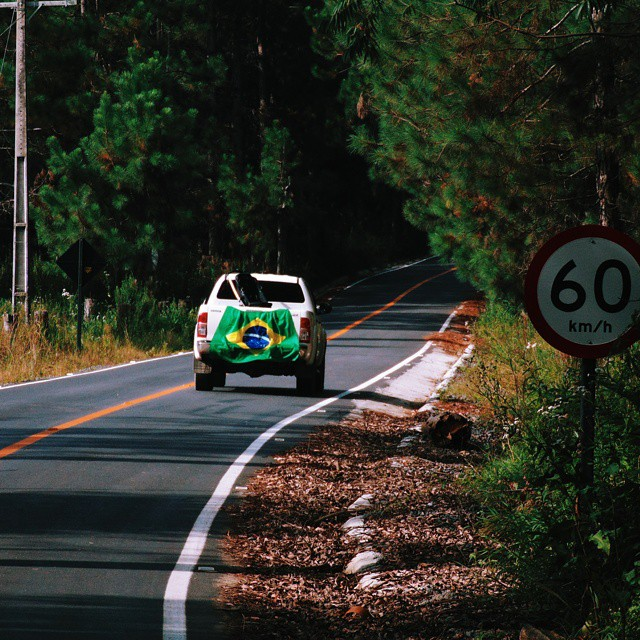
Section of SP-247.

=== Length ===
- Initial Km: 0.000
- Final Km: 35.000

=== Served localities ===
- Bananal
