= SP-81 (São Paulo highway) =

State highway in São Paulo, Brazil

SP-081

Route information
- Length: 14.700 km (9.134 mi)

Location
- Country: Brazil
- State: São Paulo

Highway system
- Highways in Brazil; Federal; São Paulo State Highways

The SP-81 is a highway in the southeastern part of the state of São Paulo in Brazil. The highway is known as the Rodovia Dr. Heitor Penteado in its entire length and begins near Campinas and runs through Sousas and ends in Cabras.
