= SP-487 (São Paulo highway) =

Highway in the state of São Paulo

SP-487

Route information
- Length: 15.160 km (9.420 mi)

Location
- Country: Brazil
- State: São Paulo

Highway system
- Highways in Brazil; Federal; São Paulo State Highways

SP-487 is a state highway in the state of São Paulo in Brazil.
