= SP-278 (São Paulo highway) =

State highway in São Paulo, Brazil

SP-278

Route information
- Length: 6.749 km (4.194 mi)

Location
- Country: Brazil
- State: São Paulo

Highway system
- Highways in Brazil; Federal; São Paulo State Highways

SP-278 is a state highway in the state of São Paulo in Brazil.
