= SP-221 (São Paulo highway) =

Highway in the state of São Paulo

SP-221

Route information
- Length: 35.000 km (21.748 mi)

Location
- Country: Brazil
- State: São Paulo

Highway system
- Highways in Brazil; Federal; São Paulo State Highways

SP-221 is a state highway in the state of São Paulo in Brazil.
