= SP-381 (São Paulo highway) =

State highway in São Paulo, Brazil

SP-381

Route information
- Length: 29.210 km (18.150 mi)

Location
- Country: Brazil
- State: São Paulo

Highway system
- Highways in Brazil; Federal; São Paulo State Highways

SP-381 is a state highway in São Paulo, Brazil.
