= SP-251 (São Paulo highway) =

State highway in São Paulo, Brazil

SP-251

Route information
- Length: 55.240 km (34.325 mi)

Location
- Country: Brazil
- State: São Paulo

Highway system
- Highways in Brazil; Federal; São Paulo State Highways

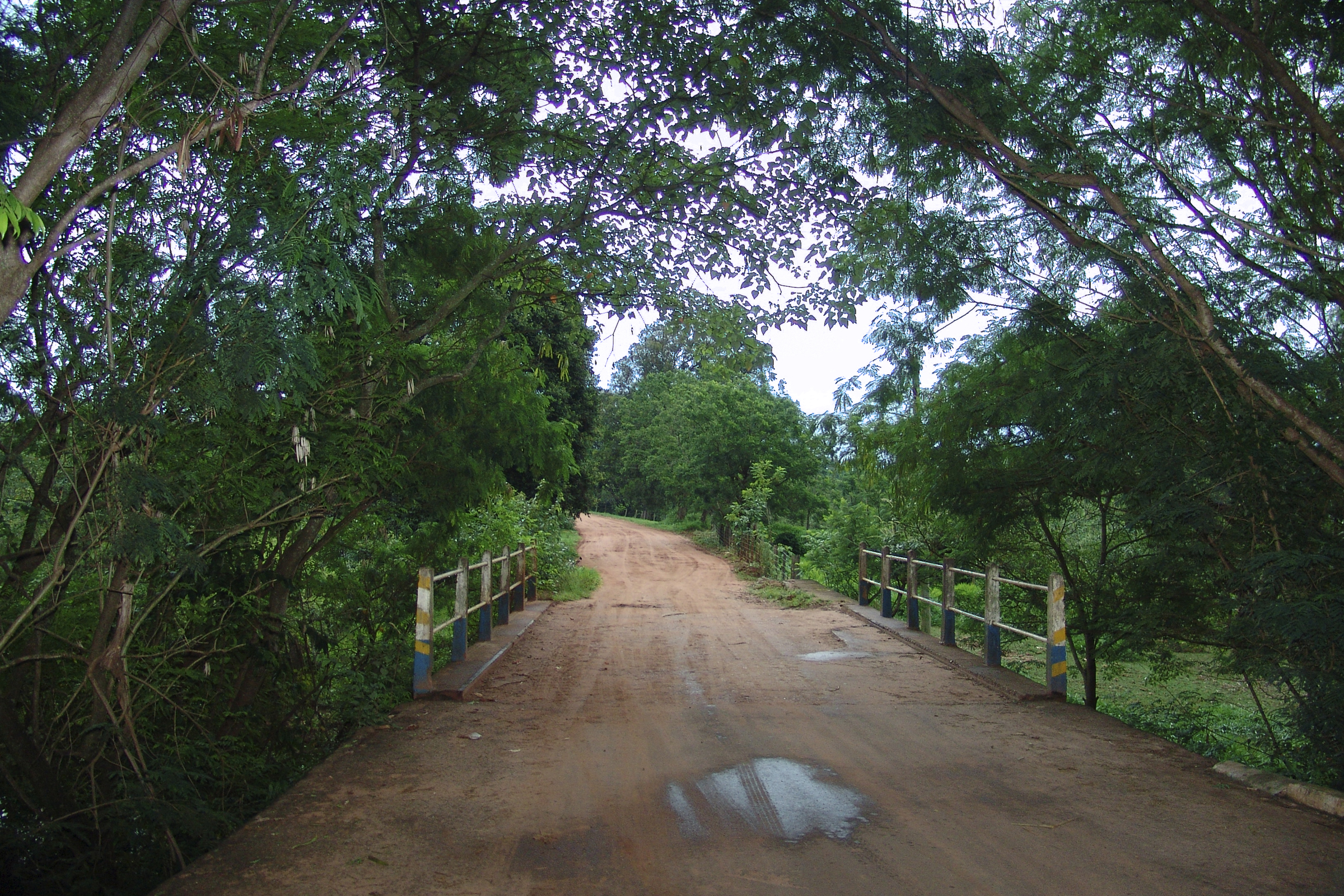
SP-251 at Chico Landi

SP-251 is a state highway in the state of São Paulo in Brazil.
