= SP-153 (São Paulo highway) =

State highway in São Paulo, Brazil

SP-153

Route information
- Length: 52.700 km (32.746 mi)

Location
- Country: Brazil
- State: São Paulo

Highway system
- Highways in Brazil; Federal; São Paulo State Highways

SP-153 is a state highway in the state of São Paulo in Brazil.
