= SP-483 (São Paulo highway) =

State highway in São Paulo, Brazil

SP-483

Route information
- Length: 41.240 km (25.625 mi)

Location
- Country: Brazil
- State: São Paulo

Highway system
- Highways in Brazil; Federal; São Paulo State Highways

SP-483 is a state highway in the state of São Paulo in Brazil. São Paulo's highway system is the largest in Brazil, comprising a vast network of state, federal, and municipal roads.
