= SP-17 (São Paulo highway) =

State highway in São Paulo, Brazil

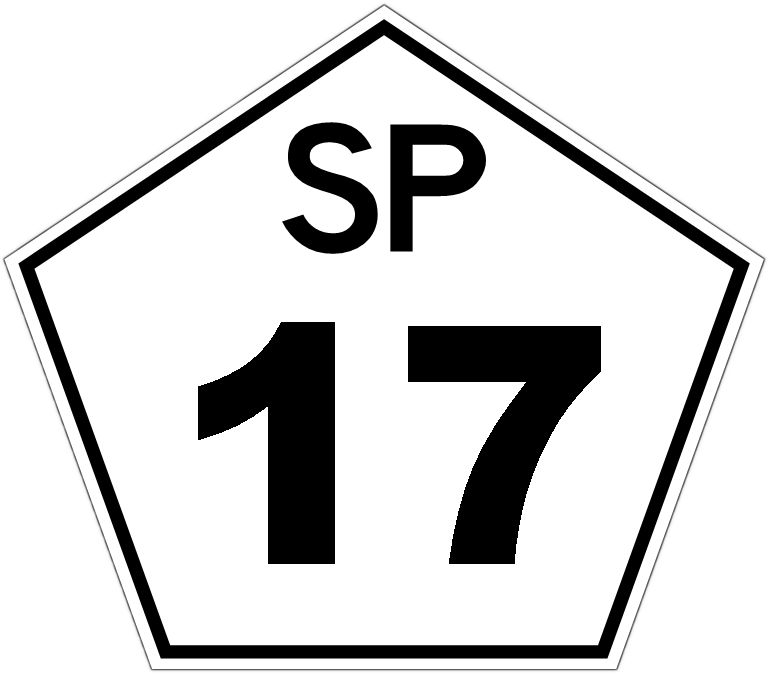
SP-17

Location
- Country: Brazil
- State: São Paulo

Highway system
- Highways in Brazil; Federal; São Paulo State Highways

SP-17 is a state highway in the state of São Paulo in Brazil.
