= SP-316 (São Paulo highway) =

Highway in the state of São Paulo

SP-316

Route information
- Length: 19.580 km (12.166 mi)

Location
- Country: Brazil
- State: São Paulo

Highway system
- Highways in Brazil; Federal; São Paulo State Highways

SP-316 is a state highway in the state of São Paulo in Brazil. It is named after Constante Peruchi, a local farmer. Constante was grandson of Venetian emigrants who lived in Cascalho, a district of Cordeirópolis.
