= SP-214 (São Paulo highway) =

State highway in São Paulo, Brazil

SP-214

Route information
- Length: 30.790 km (19.132 mi)

Location
- Country: Brazil
- State: São Paulo

Highway system
- Highways in Brazil; Federal; São Paulo State Highways

SP-214 is a state highway in the state of São Paulo in Brazil. It starts in southwest São Paulo in the Socorro municipality and ends at a roundabout in Embu-Guaçu. The highway spans about 22 kilometers or 13.6 miles.
