= SP-421 (São Paulo highway) =

State of Sao Paulo Highway

SP-421

Route information
- Length: 150.180 km (93.318 mi)

Location
- Country: Brazil
- State: São Paulo

Highway system
- Highways in Brazil; Federal; São Paulo State Highways

SP-421 is a state highway in the state of São Paulo in Brazil.
