= SP-105 (São Paulo highway) =

Highway in the state of São Paulo

SP-105

Route information
- Length: 12.400 km (7.705 mi)

Location
- Country: Brazil
- State: São Paulo

Highway system
- Highways in Brazil; Federal; São Paulo State Highways

SP-105 is a state highway in the state of São Paulo in Brazil.
