= SP-257 (São Paulo highway) =

Highway in State of Sao Paulo, Brazil

SP-257

Route information
- Length: 19.500 km (12.117 mi)

Location
- Country: Brazil
- State: São Paulo

Highway system
- Highways in Brazil; Federal; São Paulo State Highways

SP-257 is a state highway in the state of São Paulo in Brazil.
