= SP-193 (São Paulo highway) =

Sao Paulo state highway

SP-193

Route information
- Length: 57.450 km (35.698 mi)

Location
- Country: Brazil
- State: São Paulo

Highway system
- Highways in Brazil; Federal; São Paulo State Highways

SP-193 is a state highway in the state of São Paulo in Brazil.
