= SP-266 (São Paulo highway) =

State highway in São Paulo, Brazil

SP-266

Route information
- Length: 80.053 km (49.743 mi)

Location
- Country: Brazil
- State: São Paulo

Highway system
- Highways in Brazil; Federal; São Paulo State Highways

SP-266 is a minor state highway in the state of São Paulo in Brazil.
