= SP-336 (São Paulo highway) =

State highway in São Paulo, Brazil

SP-336

Route information
- Length: 46.770 km (29.062 mi)

Location
- Country: Brazil
- State: São Paulo

Highway system
- Highways in Brazil; Federal; São Paulo State Highways

SP-336 is a state highway in the state of São Paulo in Brazil.
