= SP-131 (São Paulo highway) =

State highway in São Paulo, Brazil

SP-131

Route information
- Length: 24.519 km (15.235 mi)

Location
- Country: Brazil
- State: São Paulo

Highway system
- Highways in Brazil; Federal; São Paulo State Highways

SP-131 is a state highway in the Brazilian state of São Paulo.

SP-131 runs exclusively in the archipelagic city of Ilhabela – being the only road of the main island of the city –, running near all the west coast of the island and half the way near its north and south coasts as well.

It is fully paved since 2007, and it receives several different names through the island.
