= SP-228 (São Paulo highway) =

State of Sao Paulo Highway

SP-228

Route information
- Length: 10.100 km (6.276 mi)

Location
- Country: Brazil
- State: São Paulo

Highway system
- Highways in Brazil; Federal; São Paulo State Highways

SP-228 is a state highway in the state of São Paulo in Brazil.
