= SP-259 (São Paulo highway) =

State highway in São Paulo, Brazil

SP-259

Route information
- Length: 45.000 km (27.962 mi)

Location
- Country: Brazil
- State: São Paulo

Highway system
- Highways in Brazil; Federal; São Paulo State Highways

SP-259 is a state highway in the state of São Paulo in Brazil.

The SP-259, also called Rodovia Caminho Paulista das Tropas, is a transversal highway administered by the São Paulo state Department of Roads (DER-SP). It connects the region between SP-249 (Bairro Capelinha) and SP-258 (Itararé), and serves the municipalities of Itaberá and Itararé.
