= Paulo Lauro =

Brazilian politician (1907–1983)

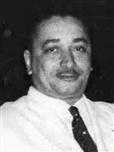
- Lauro in 1951

Mayor of São Paulo
- In office 29 August 1947 – 25 August 1948
- Preceded by: Cristiano Stockler das Neves
- Succeeded by: Milton Improta

Federal Deputy from São Paulo

Personal details
- Born: 19 November 1907 Descalvado, São Paulo, Brazil
- Died: 5 August 1983 (aged 75) São Paulo, Brazil
- Party: Progressive Republican Party (1945–1946); Social Progressive Party; ARENA
- Education: University of São Paulo

Paulo Lauro (19 November 1907 – 5 August 1983) was a Brazilian lawyer and politician who was the mayor of São Paulo from 1947 to 1948. He was the first Black mayor of the city. He later became a federal deputy representing the state of São Paulo in the 1950s and 1960s.

== Biography ==
Lauro was born on 19 November 1907, in Descalvado, São Paulo to Alfredo Gonçalves Lauro and Leopoldina Lauro. He was a Roman Catholic. He graduated with a law degree from the University of São Paulo in 1932. He became a criminal defense attorney in São Paulo while also teaching in local schools. He later worked as a journalist, becoming a director of two newspapers. He was married to Diva da Fonseca and had two children, Paulo Lauro Júnior and Dora Aparecida.

During his career as a lawyer, he achieved fame in both the public and legal spheres in 1938 after he represented the defendant in what was dubbed the "Chinese restaurant massacre" case. The case involved the murders and attempted robbery of 4 people, the owners of a Chinese restaurant in São Paulo and two of their waiters, as part of a revenge plot by a maltreated former employee, Arias de Oliveira. Oliveira was acquitted in the first of two trials after Lauro convinced the jury to rule in his favor despite police evidence and a signed confession by Oliveira himself. He was later convicted in a second trial and was sentenced to thirty years in prison.

A colleague of Adhemar de Barros, Lauro was a member of the iteration of the Progressive Republican Party that Barros founded in 1945 until its merger with the Social Progressive Party (PSP) a year later. Lauro went on to join the newly formed party. He was the Secretary of Justice at São Paulo city hall when in 1947, he was appointed by now-governor of São Paulo state Barros to serve as the mayor of São Paulo from 1947 to 1948. Lauro became the first Black mayor of the city, and one of two Black mayors in São Paulo's history, the second being Celso Pitta. He constructed numerous infrastructure projects throughout the city during his time in office.

Lauro later became a federal deputy for the state of São Paulo in on and off terms during the 1950s and 1960s. He went to become leader or vice-leader of the PSP parliamentary group at various points. He also was a member of the Constitution and Justice and Education and Culture commissions. Lauro went on to oppose much of president Jânio Quadros' policies as a member of Congress, contributing to the turbulent political climate that led to his resignation. He also opposed the normalization of relations with the Soviet Union by Quadros' successor João Goulart, as well as further state intervention in public utilities. After the 1964 Brazilian coup d'état and the establishment of the military dictatorship, he became a member of ARENA and ran again for Congress in 1966, but was not elected.

After retiring from politics, he returned to practicing law and later became an economics professor. He died on 5 August 1983 in São Paulo. A section of highway SP-215, from Descalvado to São Carlos, was named in his honor.

Political offices
| Preceded by Cristiano Stockler das Neves | Mayor of São Paulo; 1947–1948 | Succeeded by Milton Improta |
