= SP-207 (São Paulo highway) =

State highway

SP-207

Route information
- Length: 33.110 km (20.574 mi)

Location
- Country: Brazil
- State: São Paulo

Highway system
- Highways in Brazil; Federal; São Paulo State Highways

SP-207 is a state highway in the state of São Paulo in Brazil.
