= Lix da Cunha =

Lix da Cunha (Portuguese pronunciation: [ˈliks da ˈkuɲɐ]) (April 9, 1896 in Mogi-Mirim – August 6, 1984 in Campinas) was an engineer and architect. In 1924, he founded a homonymous construction company located in Campinas, Brazil. The SP-73 highway is named after him.
