= SP-423 (São Paulo highway) =

State highway in São Paulo, Brazil

SP-423

Route information
- Length: 36.000 km (22.369 mi)

Location
- Country: Brazil
- State: São Paulo

Highway system
- Highways in Brazil; Federal; São Paulo State Highways

SP-423 is a state highway in the state of São Paulo in Brazil.

Also known as Luiz Highway Delbem, the SP-423 highway passes through the municipalities of Nova Granada and Palestina.
