= SP-379 (São Paulo highway) =

State highway in São Paulo, Brazil

SP-379

Route information
- Length: 52.530 km (32.641 mi)

Location
- Country: Brazil
- State: São Paulo

Highway system
- Highways in Brazil; Federal; São Paulo State Highways

SP-379 is a state highway in the state of São Paulo in Brazil.
