= SP-350 (São Paulo highway) =

State highway in São Paulo, Brazil

Coordinates: 21°42′21″S 46°56′49″W

SP-350

Route information
- Length: 59.060 km (36.698 mi)

Location
- Country: Brazil
- State: São Paulo

Highway system
- Highways in Brazil; Federal; São Paulo State Highways

SP-350 is a state highway in the state of São Paulo in Brazil.
