= SP-215 (São Paulo highway) =

State highway in São Paulo, Brazil

SP-215

Route information
- Length: 209.900 km (130.426 mi)

Location
- Country: Brazil
- State: São Paulo

Highway system
- Highways in Brazil; Federal; São Paulo State Highways

SP-215 is a state highway in the state of São Paulo in Brazil. Part of it consists of the Rodovia Luís Augusto de Oliveira, Rodovia Dr. Paulo Lauro and Rodovia Deputado Vicente Botta.
