= SP-344 (São Paulo highway) =

Highway in São Paulo

SP-344

Route information
- Length: 98.900 km (61.454 mi)

Location
- Country: Brazil
- State: São Paulo

Highway system
- Highways in Brazil; Federal; São Paulo State Highways

SP-344 is a state highway in the state of São Paulo in Brazil.
