= SP-95 (São Paulo highway) =

Highway in São Paulo, Brazil

SP-095

Route information
- Length: 74.400 km (46.230 mi)

Location
- Country: Brazil
- State: São Paulo

Highway system
- Highways in Brazil; Federal; São Paulo State Highways

SP-95 is a state highway in the state of São Paulo in Brazil.
