= Rodovia dos Romeiros =

Highway of high historical value in the State of São Paulo, Brazil

Rodovia dos Romeiros
- Estrada dos Romeiros (Portuguese)

Route information
- Maintained by DER
- Length: 71 km (44 mi)
- Existed: May 1, 1922–present

Major junctions
- East end: Barueri next to Carapicuíba
- SP-274; Rodovia Castelo Branco; SP-300
- West end: Itu, São Paulo

Location
- Country: Brazil
- State: São Paulo
- Municipalities: Barueri, Santana de Parnaíba, Pirapora do Bom Jesus, Cabreúva, Itu

Highway system
- Highways in Brazil; Federal

Rodovia dos Romeiros (SP-312), better known as Estrada dos Romeiros, is a highway in state of São Paulo, in Brazil

== History ==
Opened on May 1, 1922, it received its name due to the tradition of religious pilgrimages to the Sanctuary of Pirapora do Bom Jesus, carried out by faithful who used the path on foot, on horseback or in buggies. Before its official inauguration, the road was already used for recreational activities, such as picnics and festivities, including a documented visit by then-governor Washington Luis on February 18, 1922.

Along its route, the road crosses areas with landscapes marked by historic coffee farms, traditional buildings and stretches of Atlantic forest. These sets were used as locations for more than 60 film productions. In 1991, the highway was included in the Tietê River Environmental Protection Area (APA), with the aim of promoting environmental preservation, leisure and cultural appreciation.

During the government of Washington Luís, the road underwent paving and maintenance work, revitalizing old historical paths, such as the bandeirista path that connected São Paulo to Porto Feliz. This initiative sought to integrate cultural and historical aspects into the development of road infrastructure.

== See also ==
- Highway system of São Paulo
- Brazilian Highway System
