= SP-141 (São Paulo highway) =

State highway in São Paulo, Brazil

SP-141

Route information
- Length: 86.500 km (53.749 mi)

Location
- Country: Brazil
- State: São Paulo

Highway system
- Highways in Brazil; Federal; São Paulo State Highways

SP-141 is a state highway in the state of São Paulo in Brazil.

== Description ==
Main points of passage: SP-270 – Capela do Alto – Tatuí – Cesário Lange – Bofete
