= SP-127 (São Paulo highway) =

Highway in São Paulo

SP-127

Route information
- Length: 215.930 km (134.173 mi)

Location
- Country: Brazil
- State: São Paulo

Highway system
- Highways in Brazil; Federal; São Paulo State Highways

SP-127 is a state highway in the state of São Paulo in Brazil.

== Designations ==
The highway bears the following names along its route:

Name: Fausto Santomauro Highway

- From – to: Rio Claro – Piracicaba
- Legislation: Law No. 639 of 05/13/1975

Name: Cornélio Pires Highway

- From – to: Piracicaba – Tietê
- Legislation: Law No. 968 of 04/09/1976

Name: Antonio Romano Schincariol Highway

- From – to: Tietê – Itapetininga
- Legislation: Law No. 1,555 of 03/06/1978

Name: Professor Francisco da Silva Pontes Highway

- From – to: Itapetininga – Capão Bonito
- Legislation: Law No. 9,536 of 05/02/1997

== Description ==
Km	Municipality	Immediate Geographic Region
0	Rio Claro	Rio Claro
15	Piracicaba	Piracicaba
44	Rio das Pedras	Piracicaba
47	Saltinho	Piracicaba
54	Rio das Pedras	Piracicaba
59	Tietê	Sorocaba
86	Cerquilho	Sorocaba
98	Tatuí	Tatuí
129	Itapetininga	Itapetininga
188	São Miguel Arcanjo	Itapetininga
192	Capão Bonito	Itapeva

=== Sections ===
Cornélio Pires Highway

The highway connects Tietê to Piracicaba, passing through the municipalities of Saltinho and Rio das Pedras. It is currently managed by the concessionaire Rodovias das Colinas and includes a toll plaza along the route.

In 2018, the section between km 55 and km 58, between Rio das Pedras and Saltinho, was duplicated (expanded to dual carriageway).

Cornélio Pires (1884–1958), the namesake of the highway, was born in the city of Tietê and was a Brazilian journalist, writer, folklorist, businessman, and cultural activist.

== Characteristics ==
=== Length ===
- Initial Km: 0.000
- Final Km: 215.930

=== Served localities ===
- Rio Claro
- Assistência
- Tanquinho
- Piracicaba
- Rio das Pedras
- Saltinho
- Tietê
- Cerquilho
- Tatuí
- Morro do Alto
- Itapetininga
- Conceição
- Varginha
- Gramadinho
- São Miguel Arcanjo
- Gramadão
- Turvo dos Almeidas
- Capão Bonito
