= USS Sequoyah =

Patrol vessel of the United States Navy

History

United States
- Name: USS Sequoyah (1917-1918); USS SP-426 (1918-1919)
- Namesake: Sequoyah was her previous name retained; SP-426 was her section patrol number
- Builder: Crockett, Pocomoke City, Maryland
- Completed: 1907
- Acquired: 24 August 1917
- Commissioned: 24 August 1917
- Decommissioned: 29 January 1919
- Fate: Returned to owner 29 January 1919
- Notes: Operated as private motorboat Sequoyah 1907-1917 and from 1919

General characteristics
- Type: Patrol vessel
- Tonnage: 15 gross register tons
- Length: 60 ft (18 m)
- Beam: 16 ft (4.9 m)
- Draft: 5 ft 3 in (1.60 m)
- Speed: 8 knots
- Complement: 6
- Armament: 1 × 1-pounder gun

USS Sequoyah (SP-426), later USS SP-426, was a United States Navy patrol vessel in commission from 1917 to 1919.

Sequoyah was built as a private motorboat of the same name in 1907 by Crockett of Pocomoke City, Maryland. On 24 August 1917, the U.S. Navy chartered her from her owner, Albert T. Lavallette of Hampton, Virginia, for use as a section patrol boat during World War I. She was commissioned as USS Sequoyah (SP-426) the same day.

Sequoyah was used for transporting ammunition and supplies in the harbor at Norfolk, Virginia, for the rest of World War I. In 1918, she was renamed USS SP-426.

SP-426 was decommissioned and returned to her owner on 29 January 1919.
