= List of state highways in São Paulo =

Highways in the Brazilian state of São Paulo include:

== Codification ==
- Radial highways - The radial highways which are numbered 2 through 360 roughly correspond to the degree number from the state capital at the zero kilometre mark (São Paulo). One example is the SP-280.
- Transversal highways—They have the number related to the final mark of the kilometre from the capital that is at the end of each highway. One example is the SP-255, after the 255th kilometre of the highway which is 255 km from the state capital (from the zero kilometre mark).

== Highways ==
=== SP-005 to SP-099 ===
- SP-005
- SP-008
- SP-010
- SP-011
- SP-015
- SP-017
- SP-019 (Rodovia Helio Smidt)
- SP-021 (Rodoanel Mário Covas)
- SP-023
- SP-029 (Rodovia Nelson Tranchesi)
- SP-031
- SP-034
- SP-036
- SP-039
- SP-040
- SP-041
- SP-042
- SP-043
- SP-046
- SP-048
- SP-050
- SP-052
- SP-054
- SP-055
- SP-056
- SP-057
- SP-058
- SP-059
- SP-060 (Rodovia Presidente Dutra)
- SP-061 (Rodovia Ariovaldo de Almeida Viana)
- SP-062
- SP-063
- SP-064
- SP-065 (Rodovia Dom Pedro I)
- SP-066
- SP-068
- SP-070
- SP-071
- SP-073
- SP-075
- SP-077
- SP-079
- SP-081
- SP-083 (Anel Viário J. R. M. Teixeira)
- SP-085
- SP-086
- SP-088
- SP-091
- SP-092
- SP-095
- SP-097
- SP-098
- SP-099 (Rodovia dos Tamoios)

=== SP-101 to SP-197 ===
- SP-101
- SP-102
- SP-103
- SP-105
- SP-107
- SP-112
- SP-113
- SP-121
- SP-122
- SP-123 (Rodovia Floriano Rodrigues Pinheiro)
- SP-125 (Rodovia Oswaldo Cruz)
- SP-127
- SP-129
- SP-131
- SP-132
- SP-133
- SP-135
- SP-137
- SP-139
- SP-141
- SP-143
- SP-147
- SP-148 (Rodovia Caminho do Mar)
- SP-150 (Rodovia Anchieta)
- SP-151
- SP-153
- SP-154
- SP-157
- SP-160 (Rodovia dos Imigrantes)
- SP-162
- SP-165
- SP-167
- SP-171
- SP-176
- SP-180
- SP-181
- SP-183
- SP-189
- SP-191
- SP-193
- SP-197

=== SP-201 to SP-294 ===
- SP-201
- SP-204
- SP-205
- SP-207
- SP-209
- SP-211
- SP-214
- SP-215 (Rodovia Dr. Paulo Lauro)
- SP-215 (Rodovia Luís Augusto de Oliveira)
- SP-216
- SP-221
- SP-222
- SP-225
- SP-226
- SP-228
- SP-230 (Rodovia Régis Bittencourt)
- SP-231
- SP-234
- SP-241
- SP-245
- SP-247
- SP-248 (Rodovia Cônego Domênico Rangoni)
- SP-249
- SP-250
- SP-251
- SP-252
- SP-253
- SP-255
- SP-256
- SP-257
- SP-258 (Rodovia Francisco Alves Negrão)
- SP-259
- SP-261
- SP-264
- SP-265
- SP-266
- SP-267
- SP-268
- SP-270 (Rodovia Raposo Tavares)
- SP-271
- SP-272
- SP-273
- SP-274 (Rodovia Engenheiro Renê Benedito da Silva)
- SP-275
- SP-276
- SP-278
- SP-280 (Rodovia Castello Branco)
- SP-281
- SP-284
- SP-287
- SP-291
- SP-293
- SP-294

=== SP-300 to SP-387 ===
- SP-300 (Rodovia Dom Gabriel Paulino Couto)
- SP-300 (Rodovia Marechal Rondon)
- SP-303
- SP-304
- SP-305
- SP-306
- SP-308
- SP-310 (Rodovia Washington Luís) and (Rodovia Feliciano Sales da Cunha)
- SP-312 (Rodovia dos Romeiros)
- SP-315
- SP-316
- SP-317
- SP-318 (Rodovia Engenheiro Thales de Lorena Peixoto Júnior)
- SP-319
- SP-320
- SP-321
- SP-322
- SP-323
- SP-324 (Rodovia Miguel Melhado Campos)
- SP-326
- SP-327
- SP-328
- SP-330 (Rodovia Anhangüera)
- SP-331
- SP-332
- SP-333
- SP-334 (Rodovia Cândido Portinari)
- SP-336
- SP-338
- SP-340
- SP-342
- SP-343 (Rodovia Maurilio Biagi)
- SP-344
- SP-345
- SP-346
- SP-348 (Rodovia dos Bandeirantes)
- SP-349
- SP-350
- SP-351
- SP-352
- SP-353
- SP-354
- SP-355
- SP-356
- SP-360
- SP-366
- SP-373
- SP-375
- SP-377
- SP-379
- SP-381
- SP-383
- SP-385
- SP-387

=== SP-413 to SP-613 ===
- SP-413
- SP-419
- SP-420
- SP-421
- SP-423
- SP-425
- SP-425d
- SP-426
- SP-427
- SP-437
- SP-442
- SP-448
- SP-457
- SP-461
- SP-463
- SP-473
- SP-479
- SP-483
- SP-487
- SP-501
- SP-527
- SP-533
- SP-541
- SP-543
- SP-557
- SP-561
- SP-563
- SP-592
- SP-595
- SP-613

== Access Highways (SPA) ==
- SPA-003/010
- SPA-009/010
- SPA-017/123
- SPA-021/010
- SPA-032/280
- SPA-040/079
- SPA-042/332
- SPA-050
- SPA-052/031
- SPA-053/280
- SPA-053/332
- SPA-056/060
- SPA-058/031
- SPA-060/270
- SPA-067/360
- SPA-068
- SPA-074/613
- SPA-079
- SPA-082/330
- SPA-086/021
- SPA-097/300
- SPA-103/079
- SPA-104/079
- SPA-109/008
- SPA-110/191
- SPA-110/332
- SPA-112/270
- SPA-115/280
- SPA-119/330
- SPA-122/065
- SPA-123
- SPA-127/304
- SPA-129/332
- SPA-135/065
- SPA-142/270
- SPA-145/270
- SPA-147/215
- SPA-149/215
- SPA-160/250
- SPA-162/270
- SPA-179/340
- SPA-191
- SPA-196/331
- SPA-227/058
- SPA-244/068
- SPA-248/055
- SPA-270
- SPA-280
- SPA-291/055
- SPA-300
- SPA-304
- SPA-312/326
- SPA-321/334
- SPA-326/270
- SPA-330
- SPA-331
- SPA-332
- SPA-334/334
- SPA-360
- SPA-565/310
- SPA-613

== Limeira Highways (LIM) ==
- LIM-010
- LIM-030
- LIM-123
- LIM-124
- LIM-125
- LIM-146
- LIM-156
- LIM-159
- LIM-169
- LIM-173
- LIM-235
- LIM-264
- LIM-274
- LIM-295
- LIM-318
- LIM-326
- LIM-335
- LIM-340
- LIM-344
- LIM-346
- LIM-353
- LIM-357
- LIM-363
- LIM-367
- LIM-371
- LIM-393
- LIM-432
- LIM-442
- LIM-446
- LIM-484
- LIM-485
- LIM-486
- LIM-490

== Campinas Highways (CAM) ==
- CAM-010 (Estrada Da Roseira)
- CAM-127 (Estrada Municipal Dona Isabel Fragoso Ferrão)
- CAM-232 (Estrada Do Feliciano)
- CAM-245 (Estrada Do Capricórnio)
- CAM-316
- CAM-337 (Estrada Do Tanquinho)
- CAM-367
- CAM-369 (Rua Professora Lydia Abdalla)

== Mombuca Highways (MBC) ==
- MBC-010
- MBC-020
- MBC-030
- MBC-040
- MBC-050
- MBC-060
- MBC-141
- MBC-143
- MBC-145
- MBC-150
- MBC-155
- MBC-161
- MBC-165
- MBC-185
- MBC-223
- MBC-239
- MBC-255
- MBC-265
- MBC-275
- MBC-319
- MBC-325
- MBC-327
- MBC-331
- MBC-335
- MBC-339
- MBC-343
- MBC-347
- MBC-351
- MBC-362
- MBC-363
- MBC-367
- MBC-375
- MBC-386
- MBC-408
- MBC-450
- MBC-460
- MBC-464
- MBC-465
- MBC-472
- MBC-475
- MBC-486

== Araçatuba Highways (ART) ==
- ART-001
- ART-002
- ART-004
- ART-006
- ART-007
- ART-009
- ART-010
- ART-015
- ART-016
- ART-018
- ART-019
- ART-020
- ART-022
- ART-023
- ART-024
- ART-025
- ART-026
- ART-027
- ART-028
- ART-029
- ART-035
- ART-040
- ART-045
- ART-047
- ART-050
- ART-060
- ART-070
- ART-072
- ART-076
- ART-079
- ART-080
- ART-082
- ART-084
- ART-107
- ART-121
- ART-131
- ART-150
- ART-155
- ART-156
- ART-164
- ART-167
- ART-168
- ART-234
- ART-264
- ART-270
- ART-303
- ART-323
- ART-332
- ART-347
- ART-349
- ART-353
- ART-359
- ART-362
- ART-363
- ART-367
- ART-369
- ART-388
- ART-435
- ART-442
- ART-446
- ART-448
- ART-452
- ART-456
- ART-457
- ART-479
- ART-480
- ART-489

== Vicinal Highways (VSP) ==
- VSP-011
- VSP-013
- VSP-020
- VSP-031
- VSP-038
- VSP-042
- VSP-043
- VSP-052
- VSP-054
- VSP-066
- VSP-076
- VSP-108
- VSP-114

== Itu highways (ITU) ==
- ITU-020
- ITU-050
- ITU-060
- ITU-477

== See also ==
- Highway system of São Paulo
- List of highways in Brazil
