= SP-147 (São Paulo highway) =

Highway in São Paulo, Brazil

SP-147

Route information
- Length: 267.590 km (166.273 mi)

Location
- Country: Brazil
- State: São Paulo

Highway system
- Highways in Brazil; Federal; São Paulo State Highways

SP-147 is a state highway in the state of São Paulo in Brazil.
