= SP-275 (São Paulo highway) =

Brazilian state highway

SP-275

Route information
- Length: 24.300 km (15.099 mi)

Location
- Country: Brazil
- State: São Paulo

Highway system
- Highways in Brazil; Federal; São Paulo State Highways

SP-275 is a state highway in the state of São Paulo in Brazil.
