= SP-107 (São Paulo highway) =

State highway in São Paulo, Brazil

SP-107

Route information
- Length: 45.490 km (28.266 mi)

Location
- Country: Brazil
- State: São Paulo

Highway system
- Highways in Brazil; Federal; São Paulo State Highways

SP-107 is a state highway in the state of São Paulo in Brazil.
