= SP-294 (São Paulo highway) =

State highway in São Paulo, Brazil

SP-294

Route information
- Length: 339.770 km (211.123 mi)

Location
- Country: Brazil
- State: São Paulo

Highway system
- Highways in Brazil; Federal; São Paulo State Highways

SP-294 is a state highway in the state of São Paulo in Brazil.
