= Rodovia Brigadeiro Faria Lima =

Highway in São Paulo, Brazil

SP-326
- Rodovia Brigadeiro Faria Lima
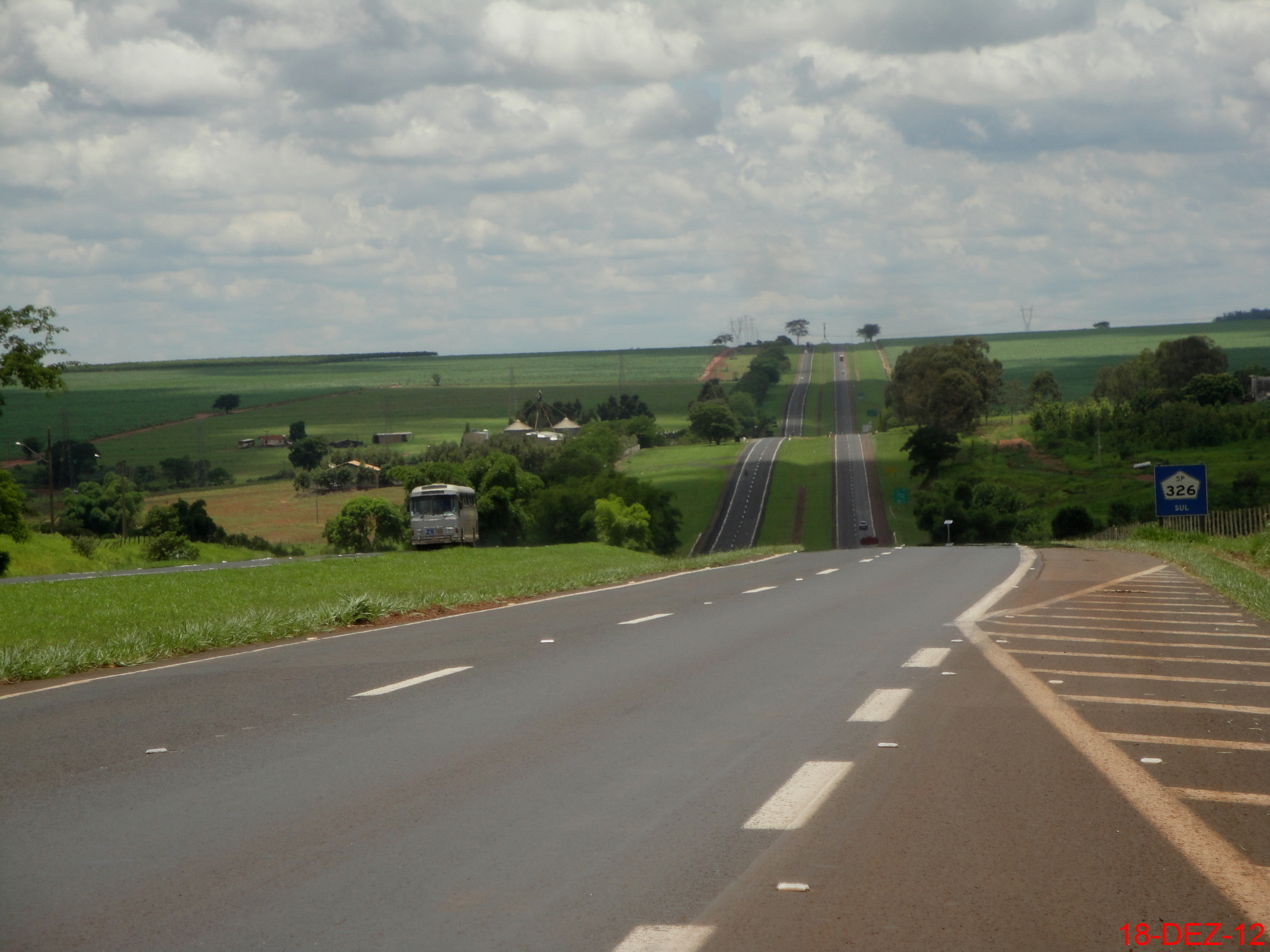
- the SP-326 passing near the city of Colina

Route information
- Maintained by Tebe

Major junctions
- South end: Bebedouro, SP
- North end: Barretos, SP

Location
- Country: Brazil
- State: São Paulo

Highway system
- Highways in Brazil; Federal; São Paulo State Highways

Rodovia Brigadeiro Faria Lima (official designation SP-326) is a highway in the state of São Paulo, Brazil.

SP-326 is a full four-lane highway connecting the cities of Bebedouro and Barretos, serving also the city of Colina, and runs from the Southeast to the Northeast. It is managed and maintained through a state concession to the private company Tebe and therefore is a toll road. The highway is named in honor of a former Air Force brigadier and celebrated mayor of the city of São Paulo from 1965 to 1969, José Vicente de Faria Lima.

== See also ==
- Highway system of São Paulo
