= Brodowski =

Brodowski (Polish pronunciation: [brɔˈdɔfski]; feminine: Brodowska; plural: Brodowscy) is a Polish-language surname.

Language	Masculine	Feminine
Polish	Brodowski	Brodowska
Belarusian (Romanization)	Брадоўскі (Bradoŭski)	Брадоўская (Bradoŭskaja, Bradouskaya, Bradouskaia)
Lithuanian	Bradauskas	Bradauskienė (married); Bradauskaitė (unmarried)
Russian (Romanization)	Бродовский (Brodovsky, Brodovskiy, Brodovskij)	Бродовская (Brodovskaya, Brodovskaia, Brodovskaja)
Ukrainian (Romanization)	Бродовський (Brodovskyi, Brodovskyy, Brodovskyj)	Бродовська (Brodovska)

== People ==
- Antoni Brodowski (1784–1832), Polish painter
- Dick Brodowski (1932–2019), American baseball player
- Fritz von Brodowski (1886–1944), German general
- Józef Brodowski the Elder (c.1772–1853), Polish painter
- Józef Brodowski the Younger (1828–1900), Polish painter, son of Antoni
- Karsten Brodowski (born 1985), German rower
- Piotr Brodowski (born 1989), Polish chess master
