= Elísio Medrado =

Municipality of Bahia State, Brazil

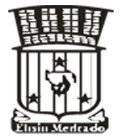
- Flag Coat of arms

- Coordinates: 12°56′45″S 39°31′19″W
- Region: Nordeste
- State: Bahia
- Founded: 20 July 1962

Population (2020)
  - Total: 8,126
- Time zone: UTC−3 (BRT)
- Postal code: 2910305

Elísio Medrado is a municipality in the state of Bahia in the North-East region of Brazil.

== See also ==
- List of municipalities in Bahia
