= 030 =

030 may refer to:

- Motorola 68030
- BR-030
- Geographical telephone calling prefixes:
  - Greater Accra area code, Ghana
  - Utrecht, Netherlands
  - Berlin, Germany
  - Bar Municipality and Ulcinj Municipality of Montenegro
  - Province of Brescia, Italy
- 030 (magazine), from Berlin
