= BR-122 (Brazil highway) =

Highway in Brazil

BR-122

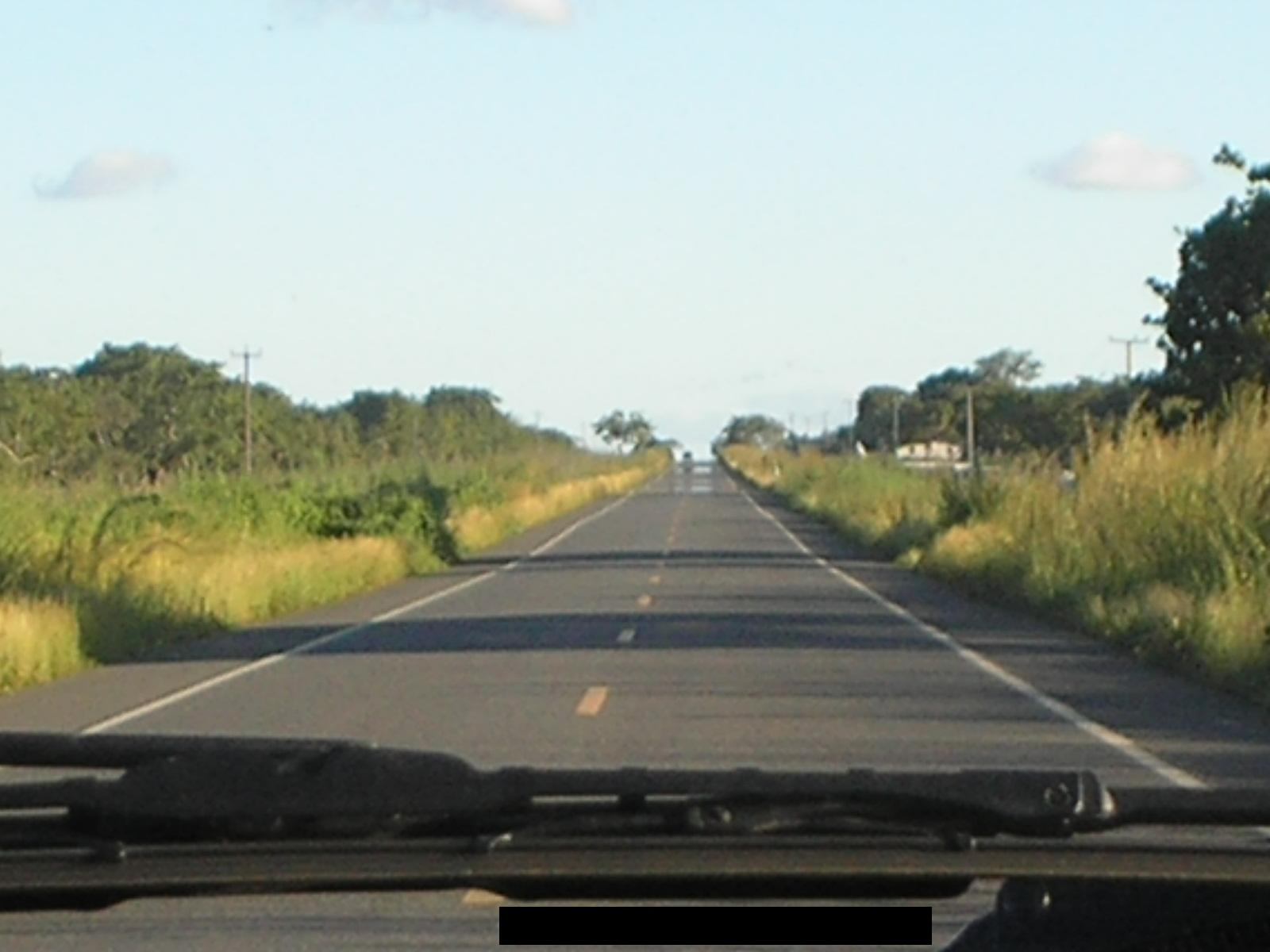
- BR-122 near Quixadá, Ceará

Route information
- Length: 1,839.7 km (1,143.1 mi)

Major junctions
- North end: Chorozinho, Ceará
- South end: Montes Claros, Minas Gerais

Location
- Country: Brazil

Highway system
- Highways in Brazil; Federal

BR-122 is a federal highway of Brazil. The 1839.7 kilometre road connects Chorozinho (near Fortaleza), Ceará to Montes Claros, Minas Gerais.
