= BR-416 (Brazil highway) =

Brazilian federal highway

BR-416

Route information
- Length: 3 km (1.9 mi)

Location
- Country: Brazil

Highway system
- Highways in Brazil; Federal

The BR-416 is a Brazilian federal highway that connects Novo Lino to São José da Laje, in the state of Alagoas. This highway had its works started in 2002, but it was never completed. It has a length of 3 km (1.9 mi), In 2017, it was presented as one of the worst highways in Brazil, due to the risk of accidents and damage caused. In 2018, the JHC announced that there is little left for the works to be completed.
