= BR-163 (Brazil highway) =

Highway of Brazil

BR-163

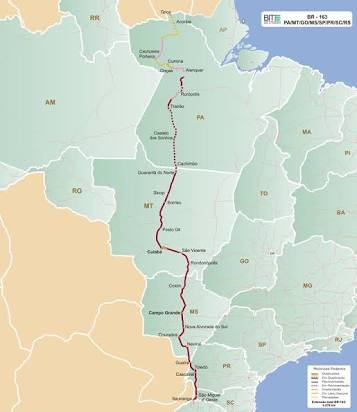

Route information
- Length: 4,426.7 km (2,750.6 mi)

Major junctions
- North end: Oriximiná, Pará
- South end: Tenente Portela, Rio Grande do Sul

Location
- Country: Brazil

Highway system
- Highways in Brazil; Federal

BR-163 is a highway in Brazil, going from Tenente Portela, in the state of Rio Grande do Sul, to Santarém, Pará, on 3579 kilometers (the stretch between Santarem and Brazil-Suriname border is only a project, the highway would have a total size of 4,426.7 km if it were all implemented). It was proposed to pave the road in its entirety part of the Avança Brasil project, which in 2007 was replaced by the Programa de Aceleração do Crescimento. A 51 km long stretch of the highway was finally paved in 2019 in the state of Pará in cooperation between the Bolsonaro government and the Brazilian army engineering battalion, until the city of Miritituba, leaving only a small part of the highway to be paved on the other side of the Amazon River.

Since the construction in 1976, most of the highway was not paved in the state of Pará, with most of the asphalt existing only from the urban area of Santarém to the city of Rurópolis. Because of this, the stretches of beaten ground turned into big puddles in times of rain, hindering the flow of agricultural crops from the region. It's a highway that integrates the South with the Midwest and North of Brazil. It's of fundamental importance for the flow of production from Pará and north of the Midwest Region of Brazil. The connection between the Mato Grosso-Pará border and the ports in the Santarém area, on the Amazon River, is about 1000 km apart, so the middle and north of Mato Grosso will have advantages in exporting its enormous agricultural and livestock production through this path, instead of the Port of Santos, which is 2000 km away.

In March 2016, 117 km of highway was converted into dual-carriageway between Rondonópolis and the border with the state of Mato Grosso do Sul.

In the state of Mato Grosso, the Federal Government has been doubling the road between the cities of Cuiabá and Rondonópolis, a stretch of 191 km. At the end of 2018, the duplication of the section between the cities of Cuiabá and Jaciara, about 100 kilometers, was inaugurated. As of March 2019, there were already 151 duplicate km, and the forecast for completion of work was 2020.

In Mato Grosso do Sul, the highway has a fundamental role in commerce, tourism and mainly in the transport logistics of the agribusiness, as it's the main export corridor in the state to reach the ports of the states of São Paulo, Paraná and Santa Catarina. The highway is extremely important for states like Mato Grosso, the largest producer of grains in the country (the state is the largest producer of soybeans, corn, and cotton, the third largest producer of beans, and the sixth largest producer of sugar cane in the country), in addition to having the largest herd of cattle in the country, more than 30 million head of cattle, which represents almost 14% of the national production alone.

For this reason, the construction, paving, and development of this highway has induced deforestation, by enabling the conversion of forested land for agricultural purposes. As in other places, road development enables land use change, contributing to a new spatial order, enabling commercial and market-driven land uses.

In the state of Paraná the highway passes through important cities like Cascavel and Toledo. In 2020 there was a 74 km stretch between Cascavel and Marmelândia being duplicated.

In the state of Santa Catarina the highway gains the status of a road center for transporting agricultural production, most notably from São Miguel do Oeste.

== In Pará state ==
In the state of Pará, the highway crosses a region marked by the presence of important Brazilian biomes, such as the Amazon rainforest, the Cerrado, and the transition areas between them, as well as river basins, such as the Amazon, Xingu, and Teles Pires-Tapajós; on the north side of the Amazon River, there is also a 103 km stretch between Oriximiná and Óbidos.

The old National Highway Plan stipulated that the highway should have an additional section connecting Oriximiná to the town of Tiriós, near the border with Suriname, passing through the Oriximiná district of Cachoeira Porteira and intersecting with the also planned BR-210. Some sections were opened, but they were never completed and are currently without maintenance.

The highway passes through the regions of:

- Oriximiná
- Óbidos
- Santarém
- Belterra
- Rurópolis (Intersection with BR-230; Access to Altamira and Marabá via BR-230)
- Itaituba (Moraes de Almeida district)
- Novo Progresso
- Altamira (Castelo dos Sonhos district)

== Gallery ==
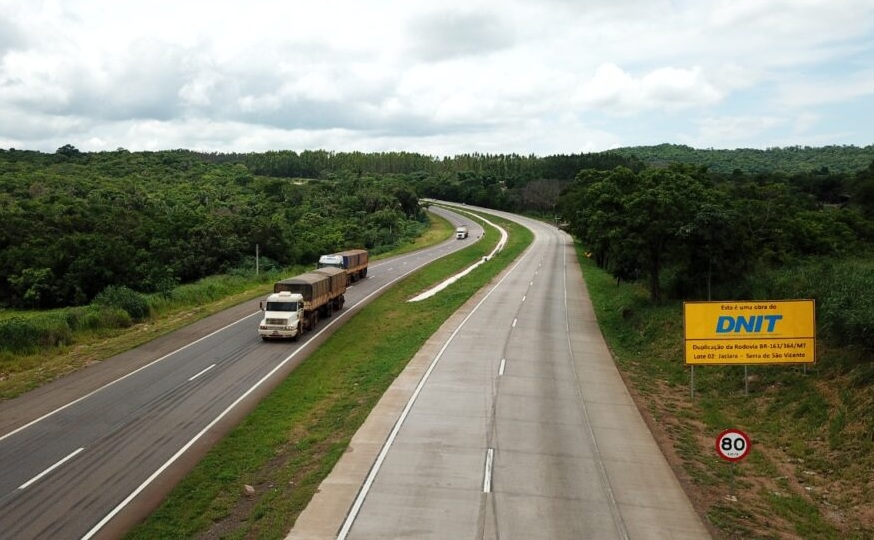
BR-163 / 364, duplicate section between Cuiabá and Rondonópolis

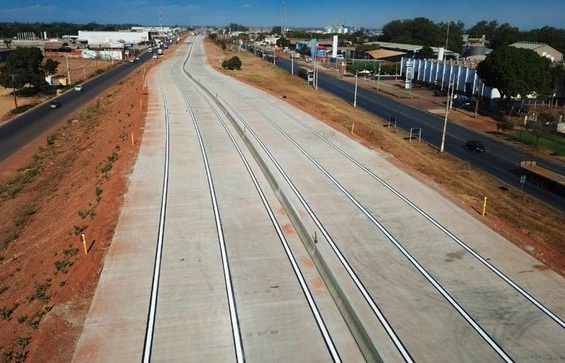
BR-163 / 364, duplicate section between Cuiabá and Rondonópolis

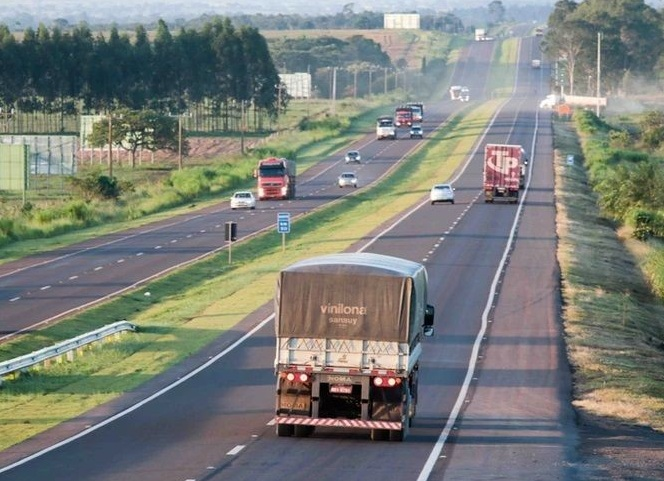
BR-163, duplicate stretch in Mato Grosso do Sul

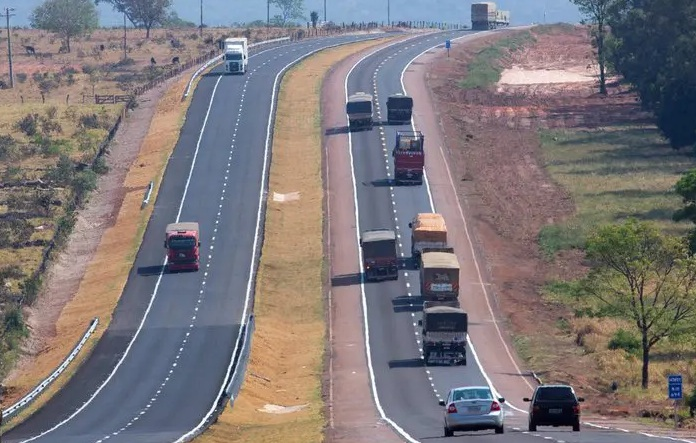
BR-163, duplicate stretch in Mato Grosso do Sul
