= BR-154 (Brazil highway) =

Highway in Brazil

BR-154

Route information
- Length: 470.3 km (292.2 mi)

Major junctions
- North end: Itumbiara, Goiás
- To: Lins, São Paulo

Location
- Country: Brazil

Highway system
- Highways in Brazil; Federal

BR-154 is a federal highway of Brazil. The 470.3-kilometre road connects the Itumbiara municipality in the state of Goiás, to Lins, in the state of São Paulo.
