= BR-373 (Brazil highway) =

Highway of Brazil

BR-373

Route information
- Length: 953 km (592 mi)

Major junctions
- northeast end: Limeira, São Paulo
- southwest end: Barracão, Paraná

Location
- Country: Brazil

Highway system
- Highways in Brazil; Federal

BR-373 is a Brazilian federal highway that begins in Limeira, São Paulo and ends in Barracão, Paraná. The highway also serves the municipalities of Itapetininga and Itapeva in São Paulo; and Ponta Grossa and Guarapuava in Paraná.
