= BR-104 (Brazil highway) =

Highway in Brazil

BR-104

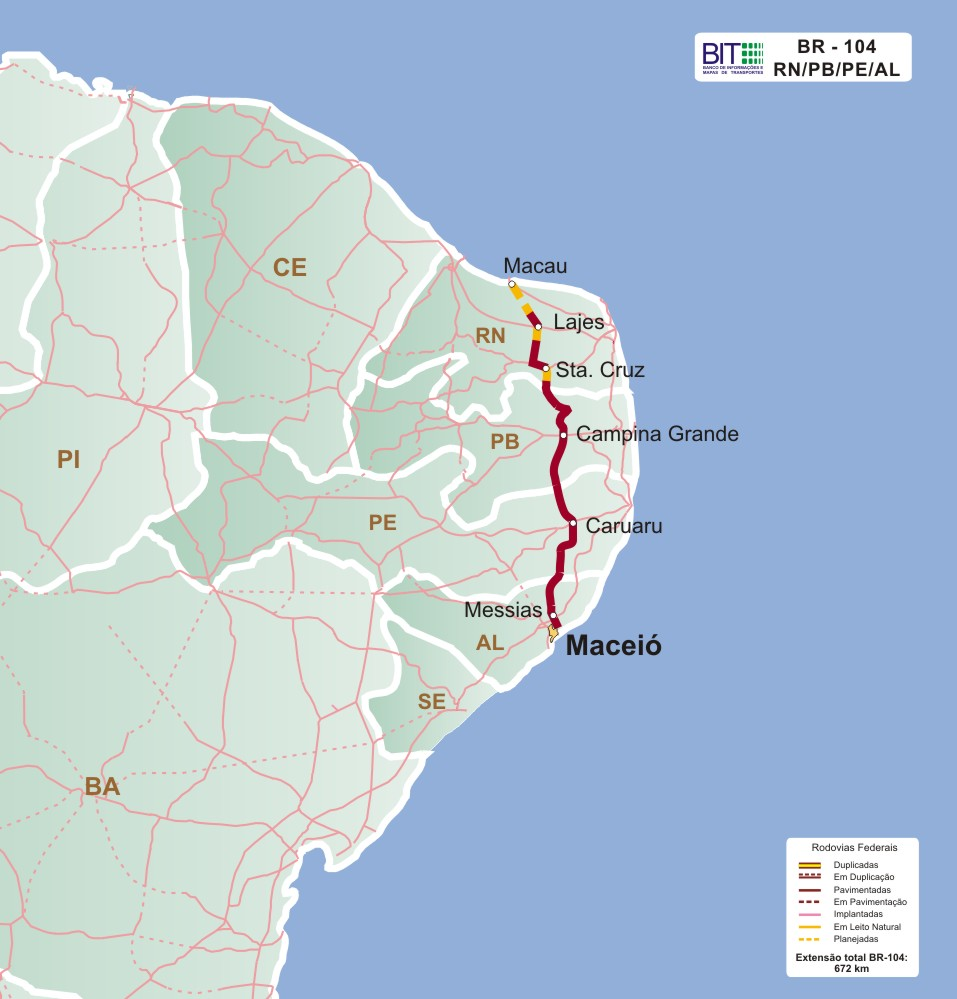

Route information
- Length: 672.3 km (417.7 mi)

Major junctions
- North end: Macau, Rio Grande do Norte
- South end: Maceió, Alagoas

Location
- Country: Brazil

Highway system
- Highways in Brazil; Federal

BR-104 is a federal highway of Brazil. The 672.3-kilometre road connects Macau to Maceió.

Campina Grande (PB) and Caruaru (PE) are famous for the biggest June festivities in Brazil. The region of Caruaru, Santa Cruz do Capibaribe and Toritama (all in Pernambuco) is home to the well-known "clothing pole". The production of these pieces is sold throughout Brazil and in South American countries, especially in Paraguay.
