= BR-080 (Brazil highway) =

Highway in Brazil

BR-080

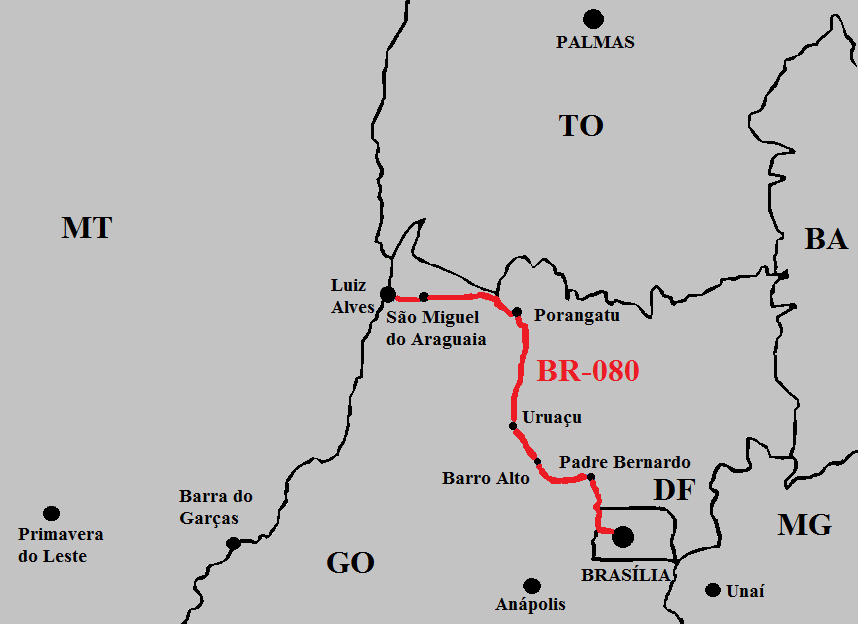

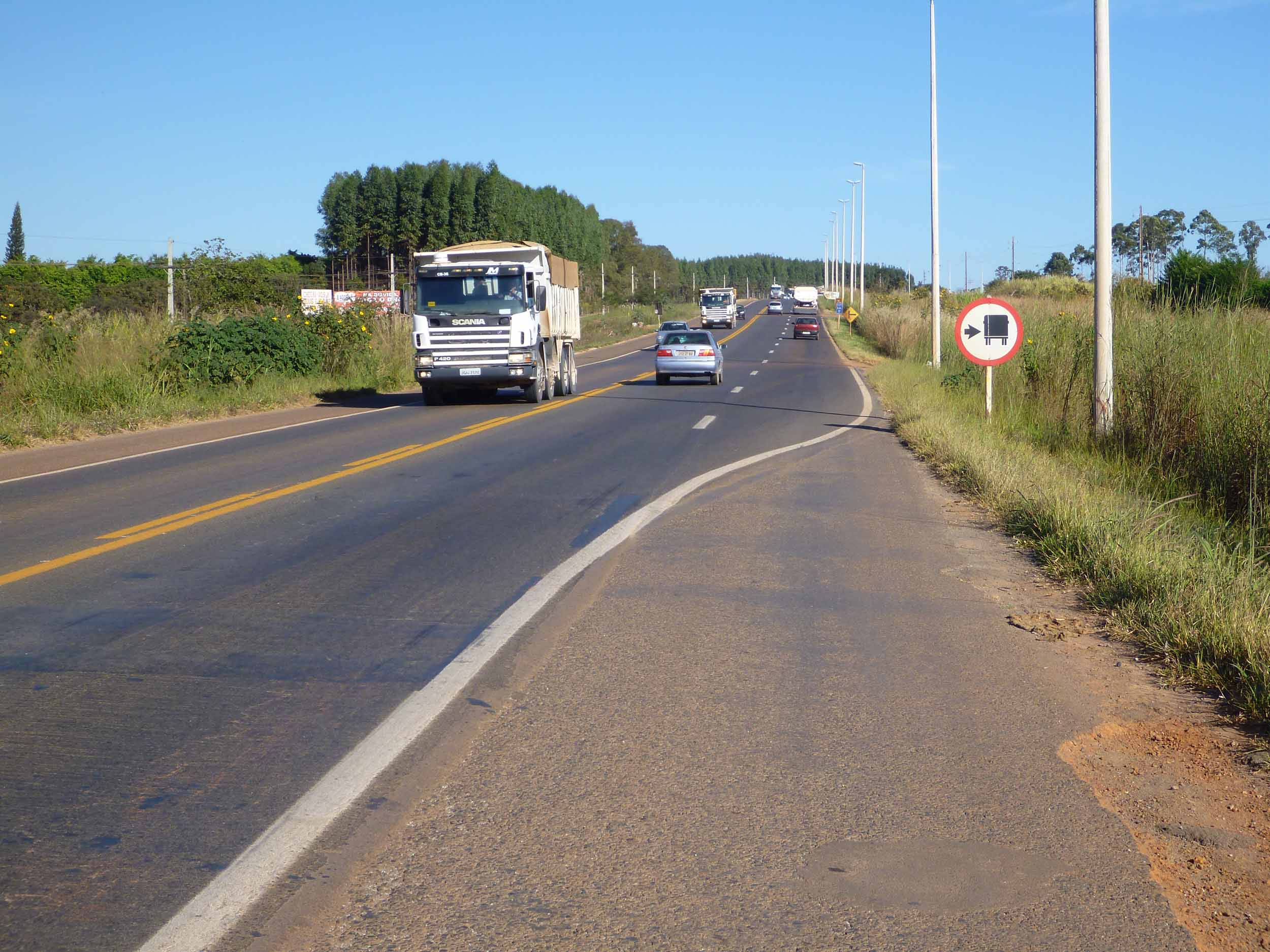
- BR-080 in Goiás

Route information
- Length: 623.8 km (387.6 mi)

Major junctions
- North end: São Miguel do Araguaia, Goiás
- South end: Brasília, Federal District

Location
- Country: Brazil

Highway system
- Highways in Brazil; Federal

BR-080 is a federal highway of Brazil. The road was originally planned to connect Brasília to São Gabriel da Cachoeira in Amazonas state near the Colombian border, an extent of 3,250 km (2,020 mi). Currently, however, it only reaches about 569 km (354 mi) to Luiz Alves, in the city of São Miguel do Araguaia in Goiás, on the border with Mato Grosso.
