= SR90 =

SR90 could refer to:

- State Route 90 - See List of highways numbered 90
- Strontium-90
