= BR-146 (Brazil highway) =

Highway in Brazil

BR-146

Route information
- Length: 678.7 km (421.7 mi)

Major junctions
- North end: Patos de Minas, Minas Gerais
- South end: Guarulhos, São Paulo

Location
- Country: Brazil

Highway system
- Highways in Brazil; Federal

BR-146 is a federal highway of Brazil. The 678.7 kilometre road connects Patos de Minas, Minas Gerais to Guarulhos, São Paulo.
