= BR-242 (Brazil highway) =

Highway in Brazil

BR-242

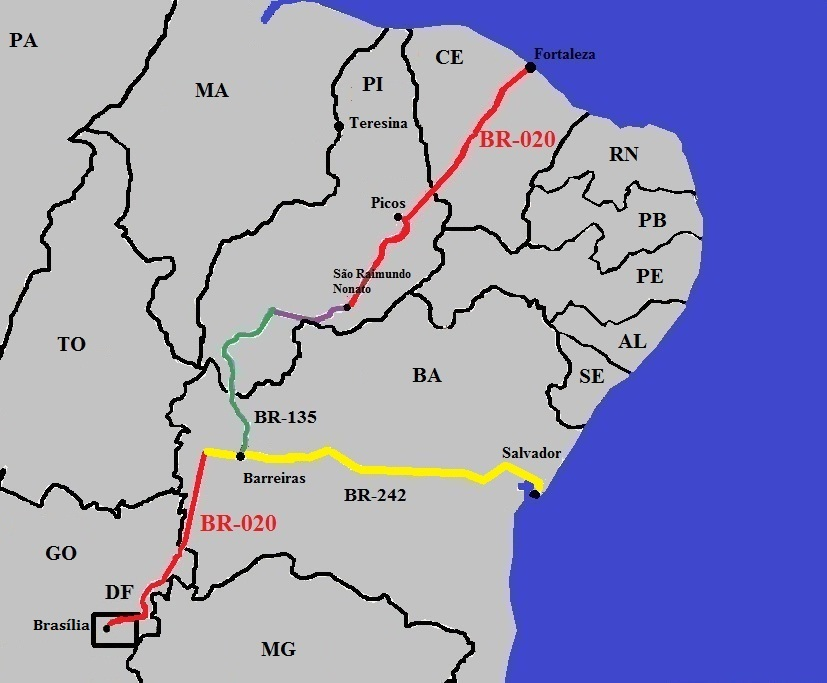

Route information
- Length: 2,295.5 km (1,426.4 mi)

Major junctions
- East end: Maragogipe, Bahia
- West end: Sorriso, Mato Grosso

Location
- Country: Brazil

Highway system
- Highways in Brazil; Federal

The BR-242 is a Brazilian federal highway that connects the cities of Maragogipe, in the state of Bahia, to Sorriso, Mato Grosso. It has a total length of 2,295.5 km.

The highway still has many sections unpaved or yet to be built, mainly in the states of Mato Grosso and Tocantins. In the state of Bahia, BR-242 is the main access road to the Chapada Diamantina ecotourism region. It passes through the MATOPIBA region (in western Bahia and Tocantins), which is an important producer of soy, corn and cotton, among other products.
