= BR-472 (Brazil highway) =

Highway in Brazil

BR-472

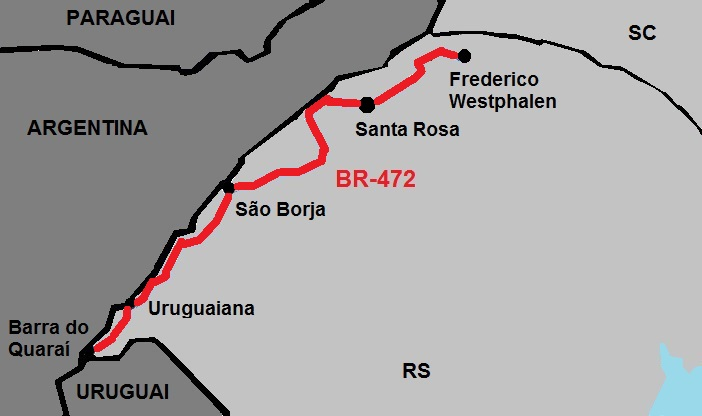

Route information
- Length: 658.5 km (409.2 mi)

Major junctions
- North end: Frederico Westphalen, Rio Grande do Sul
- South end: Barra do Quaraí, Rio Grande do Sul

Location
- Country: Brazil

Highway system
- Highways in Brazil; Federal

The BR-472 is a Brazilian federal highway that connects Frederico Westphalen and Barra do Quaraí, in the state of Rio Grande do Sul. It has a total length of 658.5 km.

The highway runs along the border with Argentina, until it reaches the triple Brazil-Argentina-Uruguay border. In the region there is a large production of soybeans, corn, rice, sheep, cattle, among other products. Uruguaiana has great international commercial strategic importance, considering that it is located equidistant from Porto Alegre, Montevideo, Buenos Aires and Asunción; as well as due to the importance in the national agricultural production.
