= Route 90 (disambiguation) =

Route 90 may refer to:

- Dublin Bus (No. 90)
- London Buses route 90

== See also ==
- List of highways numbered 90
