= BA-099 (Bahia highway) =

Highway in Bahia, Brazil

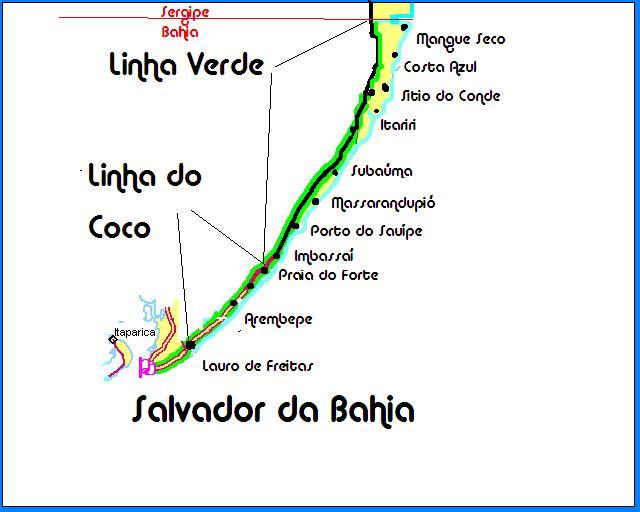

Route information
- Length: 356 km (221 mi)

Major junctions
- From: Salvador International Airport, in Salvador
- To: Aracaju - next to Sergipe state border

Location
- Country: Brazil
- State: Bahia
- Major cities: Salvador, Lauro de Freitas (Bahia), Aracaju (Sergipe)

Highway system
- Highways in Brazil; Federal

The Rodovia Estrada do Coco and Linha Verde, (BA-099), is a state highway which runs through the northeastern part of the state of Bahia and southeastern region of the state of Sergipe in Brazil. The road connects the city of Salvador, the capital of Bahia, to the city of Aracaju, the capital of Sergipe.

== History ==
The highway is maintained by a state concession to the private company CLN (Concessionária Litoral Norte) since 2001, and so is a toll road. This ownership transfer has improved road quality and safety.

== Transport ==
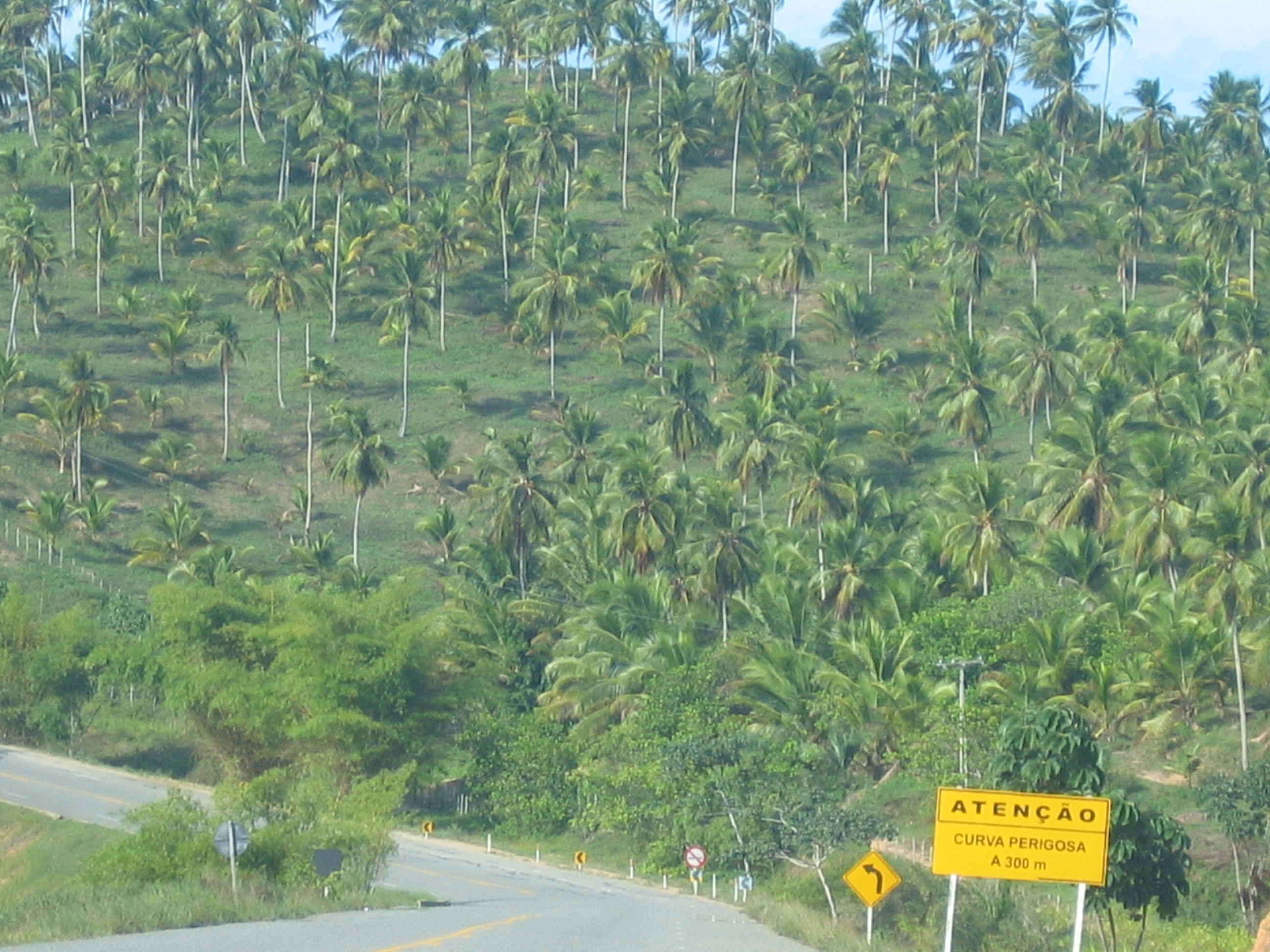
BA-099, Linha Verde part.

=== By Car ===
From the city of Salvador to the North Coast direction, one can get along Itapuã or via Paralela, both of them to the Airport direction.

=== By Bus ===
The bus company serving the road is called Linha Verde.

=== From Salvador ===
A bus company Linha Verde offers the route journey between 5 am and 6 pm that starts from Itaparica island, and covers multiple stops like G. Barbosa supermarket, the Iguatemi Shopping Center, Extra Paralela supermarket and the BA-099 (Coconut) Highway North.
