= BR-324 (Brazil highway) =

Highway in Brazil

BR-324

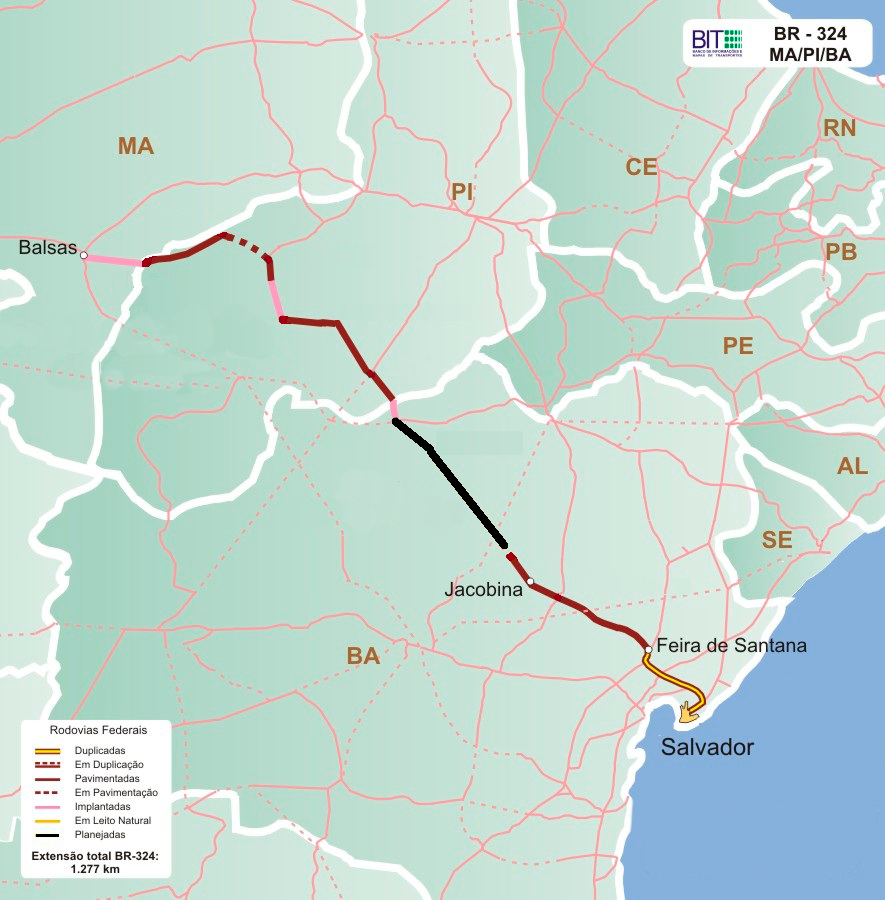

Route information
- Length: 1,270.9 km (789.7 mi)

Major junctions
- East end: Salvador, Bahia
- West end: Balsas, Maranhão

Location
- Country: Brazil

Highway system
- Highways in Brazil; Federal

BR-324 is a federal highway in the Northeast Region of Brazil. The 1270.9 km road goes from Balsas, Maranhão, across the states of Piauí and Bahia to the Bahian state capital, Salvador.
