= BR-383 (Brazil highway) =

Highway of Brazil

BR-383

Route information
- Length: 566.4 km (351.9 mi)

Major junctions
- north end: Conselheiro Lafaiete, Minas Gerais
- south end: Ubatuba, São Paulo

Location
- Country: Brazil

Highway system
- Highways in Brazil; Federal

BR-383 is a Brazilian federal highway that begins in Conselheiro Lafaiete, Minas Gerais at the junction with BR-040 and ends in Ubatuba, in the state of São Paulo. The highway also serves the municipalities of São João del Rei, São Lourenço and Itajubá in Minas Gerais and Campos do Jordão and Taubaté in São Paulo.
