= List of federal highways in Brazil =

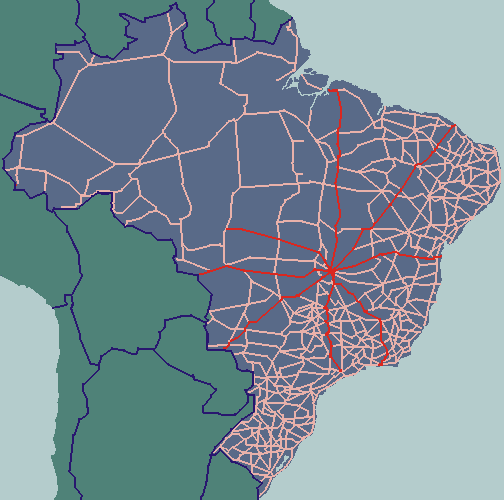
Radial highways in Brazil highlighted in red

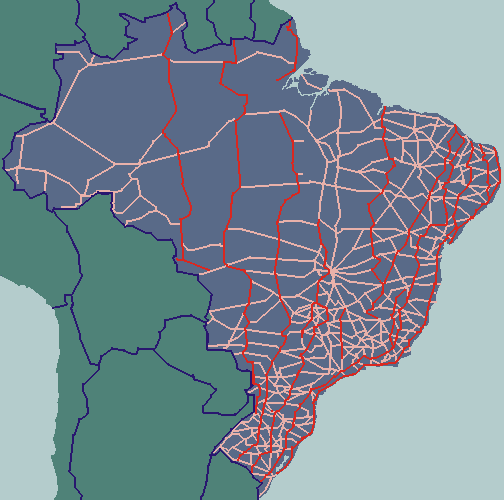
North-south highways in Brazil highlighted in red

This is a list of the federal highways in Brazil. The current numbering system has existed since 1964, with changes in 1973.

Brazilian federal road names are composed of the ISO 3166 code "BR", a dash and three numbers. State highways in the country are classified as YY-XXX, where YY is the abbreviation of the state where the highway is located and XXX is a number. The first digit in the number determines which of the five categories the National Road System divides it into.

== Radial highways ==
BR-0X0 – start at the DF-001 in the Federal District and head towards the extremes of the country. Radial highways are identified by the first digit "0", and the other two vary between 10 and 90, always in multiples of ten, each one heading in a different direction clockwise from the DF-001. The direction of the distance starts from the DF-001, with the kilometre zero of each state being at the point of the highway closest to the federal capital. There are nine federal radial highways, including the BR-090, which has not yet been completed.

Number	Length (km)	Length (mi)	Southern or western terminus	Northern or eastern terminus	Formed	Removed	Notes
BR-010	1954.1	1,214.2	—	—	—	—	Engenheiro Bernardo Sayã Highway
BR-020	2038.5	1,266.7	—	—	—	—	
BR-030	1158.0	719.5	—	—	—	—	
BR-040	1139.3	707.9	—	—	—	—	
BR-050	1025.3	637.1	—	—	—	—	
BR-060	1329.3	826.0	—	—	—	—	
BR-070	1317.7	818.8	—	—	—	—	
BR-080	623.8	387.6	—	—	—	—	
BR-090	—	—	—	—	—	—	

== North-south highways ==
- BR-1XX – highways cross the country in a north–south direction. Distance is measured in this direction, except for the BR-156, BR-163 and BR-174, where the distance is measured from south to north. The numbering ranges from 00 to 50 on the stretch from the far east of the country to Brasilia, and from 50 to 99 between the capital and the far west.

Number	Length (km)	Length (mi)	Southern or western terminus	Northern or eastern terminus	Formed	Removed	Notes
BR-101	4551.4	2,828.1	São José do Norte, RS	Touros, RN	—	—	Translitorânea/Governador Mário Covas Highway
BR-102	145	90	Greater Florianopolis, SC	Joinville, SC	—	—	Via Mar
BR-104	672.3	417.7	—	—	—	—	
BR-110	1091.1	678.0	—	—	—	—	
BR-116	4566.5	2,837.5	Jaguarão, RS	Fortaleza, CE	—	—	Presidente Dutra Highway
BR-118	0.262	0.163	—	—	—	—	
BR-120	964.5	599.3	—	—	—	—	
BR-122	1839.7	1,143.1	—	—	—	—	
BR-125	7.564	4.700	—	—	—	—	
BR-130	179.475	111.521	—	—	—	—	
BR-134	1.055	0.656	—	—	—	—	
BR-135	2518.5	1,564.9	—	—	—	—	
BR-145	2.736	1.700	—	—	—	—	
BR-146	678.7	421.7	—	—	—	—	
BR-148	0.0259	0.0161	—	—	—	—	
BR-153	3566.3	2,216.0	Aceguá, RS	São Domingos do Araguaia, PA	—	—	Transbrasiliana Highway
BR-154	470.3	292.2	—	—	—	—	
BR-155	—	—	—	—	—	—	
BR-156	805.0	500.2	—	—	—	—	
BR-158	3955.0	2,457.5	Santana do Livramento, RS	Altamira, PA	—	—	
BR-163	4426.7	2,750.6	Tenente Portela, RS	Santarém, PA	—	—	
BR-174	2798.4	1,738.8	—	—	—	—	
BR-174B	75.563	46.953	—	—	—	—	
BR-182	9.495	5.900	—	—	—	—	
BR-189	22.857	14.203	—	—	—	—	
BR-196	7.244	4.501	—	—	—	—	
BR-198	3.786	2.353	—	—	—	—	

== East-west highways ==
BR-2XX – crosses the country in an east–west direction. The distance of these highways is always measured in this direction. The numbering ranges from 00 to 50 in the section that goes from the extreme north of the country to Brasilia, and from 50 to 99 between the capital and the extreme south.

Number	Length (km)	Length (mi)	Southern or western terminus	Northern or eastern terminus	Formed	Removed	Notes
BR-207	2.656	1.650	—	—	—	—	
BR-210	2454.7	1,525.3	—	—	—	—	North Perimeter
BR-216	6.437376	4.000000	—	—	—	—	Av. Alair Ferreira
BR-222	1819.8	1,130.8	—	—	—	—	
BR-223	0.45	0.28	—	—	—	—	Av. João XXIII
BR-226	1673.0	1,039.6	—	—	—	—	
BR-230	4965.1	3,085.2	—	—	—	—	
BR-232	553.5	343.9	—	—	—	—	
BR-235	2093.5	1,300.8	—	—	—	—	
BR-238	214.664	133.386	—	—	—	—	
BR-242	2295.5	1,426.4	—	—	—	—	Milton Santos Highway
BR-246	0.3	0.19	—	—	—	—	
BR-251	2481.1	1,541.7	—	—	—	—	Julio Garcia Highway
BR-253	0.805	0.500	—	—	—	—	Transbrasiliana Highway
BR-259	704.4	437.7	—	—	—	—	
BR-262	2295.4	1,426.3	—	—	—	—	
BR-263	0.4	0.25	—	—	—	—	
BR-264	2.404	1.494	—	—	—	—	
BR-265	966.4	600.5	—	—	—	—	
BR-266	2.413	1.499	—	—	—	—	
BR-267	1921.9	1,194.2	—	—	—	—	
BR-272	904.0	561.7	—	—	—	—	
BR-273	7.081	4.400	—	—	—	—	
BR-277	736.6	457.7	—	—	—	—	Great Highway
BR-280	642.2	399.0	—	—	—	—	
BR-282	678.0	421.3	—	—	—	—	
BR-283	52.562	32.661	—	—	—	—	
BR-285	355.5	220.9	São Borja, RS	Araranguá, SC	—	—	
BR-287	749.6	465.8	São Borja, RS	Canoas, RS	—	—	Integration Highway
BR-290	729.7	453.4	Uruguaiana, RS	Osório, RS	—	—	Osvaldo Aranha Highway
BR-293	532.3	330.8	Quaraí, RS	Pelotas, RS	—	—	

== Diagonal highways ==
BR-3XX – crosses the country in two ways: northwest-southeast or northeast–southwest. The numbering can vary from 01 to 99.

Number	Length (km)	Length (mi)	Southern or western terminus	Northern or eastern terminus	Formed	Removed	Notes
BR-304	422.3	262.4	—	—	—	—	
BR-307	1695.30	1,053.41	—	—	—	—	
BR-308	650.7	404.3	—	—	—	—	
BR-312	10.447	6.491	—	—	—	—	Av. Rio De Janeiro
BR-315	7.262	4.512	—	—	—	—	
BR-316	2062.20	1,281.39	—	—	—	—	
BR-317	931.7	578.9	—	—	—	—	
BR-318	0.322	0.200	—	—	—	—	
BR-319	880.4	547.1	—	—	—	—	Alvaro Maia Highway
BR-324	1270.90	789.70	—	—	—	—	
BR-330	1177.10	731.42	—	—	—	—	
BR-337	26.797	16.651	—	—	—	—	PE-337
BR-340	0.322	0.200	—	—	—	—	
BR-342	744.1	462.4	—	—	—	—	
BR-343	747.9	464.7	—	—	—	—	
BR-345	—	—	—	—	—	—	
BR-349	1242.40	771.99	—	—	—	—	
BR-352	816.5	507.3	—	—	—	—	
BR-354	852.7	529.8	—	—	—	—	
BR-356	453	281	—	—	—	—	
BR-357	0.966	0.600	—	—	—	—	Av. Aureliano Moura Brandão
BR-359	645.5	401.1	—	—	—	—	
BR-360	1.042	0.647	—	—	—	—	
BR-361	261	162	—	—	—	—	
BR-363	13.6	8.5	—	—	—	—	
BR-364	4141.50	2,573.41	—	—	—	—	
BR-365	878.7	546.0	—	—	—	—	
BR-366	0.056	0.035	—	—	—	—	
BR-367	762.5	473.8	—	—	—	—	
BR-368	87.740	54.519	—	—	—	—	
BR-369	1232.00	765.53	—	—	—	—	
BR-370	8.208	5.100	—	—	—	—	
BR-373	953	592	—	—	—	—	
BR-374	573.6	356.4	—	—	—	—	
BR-376	958.3	595.5	—	—	—	—	
BR-376a	1.005	0.624	—	—	—	—	
BR-377	523	325	—	—	—	—	
BR-380	28.968	18.000	—	—	—	—	
BR-381	1169.30	726.57	—	—	—	—	Fernão Dias Highway
BR-383	566.4	351.9	—	—	—	—	
BR-385	2.092	1.300	—	—	—	—	
BR-386	530.4	329.6	—	—	—	—	
BR-387	0.966	0.600	—	—	—	—	
BR-392	718.8	446.6	—	—	—	—	
BR-393	444.8	276.4	—	—	—	—	
BR-394	18.5	11.5	—	—	—	—	
BR-396	0.341	0.212	—	—	—	—	

== Link highways ==
BR-4XX – connects federal highways to nearby towns, other highways, or international borders, or that cannot be classified in any of the other types. There are also a few short highways beginning with BR-6XX, such as the BR-600.

Number	Length (km)	Length (mi)	Southern or western terminus	Northern or eastern terminus	Formed	Removed	Notes
BR-401	199.2	123.8	—	—	—	—	
BR-402	753.4	468.1	—	—	—	—	
BR-403	337.8	209.9	—	—	—	—	
BR-404	484.2	300.9	—	—	—	—	
BR-405	258.0	160.3	—	—	—	—	
BR-406	176.4	109.6	—	—	—	—	
BR-407	1469.7	913.2	—	—	—	—	
BR-408	187.0	116.2	—	—	—	—	
BR-409	152.0	94.4	—	—	—	—	
BR-410	33.8	21.0	—	—	—	—	
BR-411	85.0	52.8	—	—	—	—	
BR-412	146.6	91.1	—	—	—	—	
BR-413	40.0	24.9	—	—	—	—	
BR-414	441.7	274.5	—	—	—	—	
BR-415	201.3	125.1	—	—	—	—	
BR-416	—	—	—	—	—	—	
BR-417	235	146	—	—	—	—	
BR-418	302.2	187.8	—	—	—	—	
BR-419	381.6	237.1	—	—	—	—	
BR-420	335.3	208.3	—	—	—	—	
BR-421	304.6	189.3	—	—	—	—	
BR-422	73.7	45.8	—	—	—	—	
BR-423	542.8	337.3	—	—	—	—	
BR-424	261.6	162.6	—	—	—	—	
BR-425	136	85	—	—	—	—	
BR-426	182.8	113.6	—	—	—	—	
BR-427	198.7	123.5	—	—	—	—	
BR-428	193.4	120.2	—	—	—	—	
BR-429	385.9	239.8	—	—	—	—	
BR-430	412.7	256.4	—	—	—	—	
BR-431	—	—	—	—	—	—	
BR-432	—	—	—	—	—	—	
BR-433	—	—	—	—	—	—	
BR-434	—	—	—	—	—	—	
BR-435	—	—	—	—	—	—	
BR-436	—	—	—	—	—	—	
BR-437	—	—	—	—	—	—	
BR-438	—	—	—	—	—	—	Caminho De Neve Route
BR-439	—	—	—	—	—	—	
BR-440	—	—	—	—	—	—	
BR-441	—	—	—	—	—	—	
BR-445	—	—	—	—	—	—	
BR-447	—	—	—	—	—	—	
BR-448	—	—	—	—	—	—	
BR-449	—	—	—	—	—	—	
BR-450	—	—	—	—	—	—	
BR-451	387.3	240.7	—	—	—	—	
BR-452	508.9	316.2	—	—	—	—	
BR-453	324.2	201.4	—	—	—	—	Route of the Sun
BR-454	71.0	44.1	—	—	—	—	
BR-455	133.0	82.6	—	—	—	—	
BR-456	218.2	135.6	—	—	—	—	
BR-457	229.0	142.3	—	—	—	—	
BR-458	144.9	90.0	—	—	—	—	
BR-459	391.5	243.3	—	—	—	—	
BR-460	84.3	52.4	—	—	—	—	
BR-461	110.0	68.4	—	—	—	—	
BR-462	100.6	62.5	—	—	—	—	
BR-463	112.5	69.9	—	—	—	—	
BR-464	500.9	311.2	—	—	—	—	
BR-465	31.9	19.8	—	—	—	—	Old Rio-São Paulo Highway
BR-466	431.1	267.9	—	—	—	—	
BR-467	117.1	72.8	—	—	—	—	
BR-468	132.7	82.5	—	—	—	—	
BR-469	31.3	19.4	—	—	—	—	
BR-470	832.9	517.5	—	—	—	—	
BR-471	648.2	402.8	—	—	—	—	
BR-472	658.5	409.2	—	—	—	—	
BR-473	388.9	241.7	—	—	—	—	
BR-474	166.9	103.7	—	—	—	—	
BR-475	213.6	132.7	—	—	—	—	
BR-476	395.8	245.9	—	—	—	—	
BR-477	213.9	132.9	—	—	—	—	
BR-478	321.6	199.8	—	—	—	—	
BR-479	433.2	269.2	—	—	—	—	
BR-480	264.5	164.4	—	—	—	—	
BR-481	168.7	104.8	—	—	—	—	
BR-482	448.8	278.9	—	—	—	—	
BR-483	330.3	205.2	—	—	—	—	
BR-484	343	213	—	—	—	—	
BR-485	51.4	31.9	—	—	—	—	Highway of Flowers
BR-486	179.9	111.8	—	—	—	—	Antônio Heil Highway
BR-487	647.7	402.5	—	—	—	—	Cattle Highway
BR-488	2.9	1.8	—	—	—	—	Raphael de Almeida Magalhães Highway
BR-489	51.5	32.0	—	—	—	—	
BR-490	181.0	112.5	—	—	—	—	
BR-491	391.6	243.3	—	—	—	—	
BR-492	47.8	29.7	—	—	—	—	
BR-493	506.0	314.4	—	—	—	—	
BR-494	33.4	20.8	—	—	—	—	
BR-495	135.7	84.3	—	—	—	—	Philuvio Cerqueira Rodrigues Highway
BR-496	135.7	84.3	—	—	—	—	
BR-497	353.0	219.3	—	—	—	—	
BR-498	14.2	8.8	—	—	—	—	
BR-499	14.9	9.3	—	—	—	—	Historian Osvaldo Henrique Castello Branco Highway
BR-600	—	—	—	—	—	—	
BR-610	—	—	—	—	—	—	Hélio Smidt Highway
