= BR-030 (Brazil highway) =

Highway in Brazil

BR-030

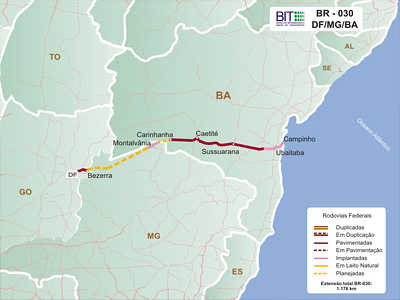

Route information
- Length: 1,158.0 km (719.5 mi)

Major junctions
- East end: Maraú, Bahia
- West end: Brasília, Federal District

Location
- Country: Brazil

Highway system
- Highways in Brazil; Federal

BR-030 is a federal highway of Brazil. The 1,158 kilometres (720 mi) road connects Brasília to Maraú.
