= BR-090 (Brazil highway) =

Highway in Brazil

BR-090

Location
- Country: Brazil

Highway system
- Highways in Brazil; Federal

BR-090 is the designation for a potential federal highway of Brazil. If built the road would connect Brasília to the extreme north of the country.
