= List of highways numbered 90 =

The following highways are numbered 90:

== Brazil ==
- BR-090

== Canada ==
- Newfoundland and Labrador Route 90
- Winnipeg Route 90

== Greece ==
- A90 motorway
- EO90 road

== Iran ==
- Road 90

== Israel/Palestine ==
- Highway 90 (Israel–Palestine)

== Italy ==
- Autostrada A90

== Korea, South ==
- Gukjido 90

== New Zealand ==
- New Zealand State Highway 90

== United Kingdom ==
- A90 road
- M90 motorway

== United States ==
- Interstate 90
- U.S. Route 90
- County Route 90 (Lee County, Alabama)
- Arizona State Route 90
- Arkansas Highway 90
- California State Route 90
- Colorado State Highway 90
- Florida State Road 90
- Georgia State Route 90
- Illinois Route 90
- Iowa Highway 90 (1926–1932) (former)
- K-90 (Kansas highway)
- Kentucky Route 90
- Maine State Route 90
- Maryland Route 90
- M-90 (Michigan highway)
- Minnesota State Highway 90 (former)
  - County Road 90 (St. Louis County, Minnesota)
- Missouri Route 90
- Nebraska Highway 90 (former)
  - Nebraska Spur 90A
  - Nebraska Spur 90B
- Nevada State Route 90 (former)
- New Jersey Route 90
  - County Route 90 (Bergen County, New Jersey)
- New Mexico State Road 90
- New York State Route 90
  - County Route 90 (Cattaraugus County, New York)
  - County Route 90 (Dutchess County, New York)
  - County Route 90 (Jefferson County, New York)
  - County Route 90 (Oneida County, New York)
  - County Route 90 (Orange County, New York)
  - County Route 90 (Rensselaer County, New York)
  - County Route 90 (Rockland County, New York)
  - County Route 90 (Saratoga County, New York)
  - County Route 90 (Steuben County, New York)
  - County Route 90 (Suffolk County, New York)
  - County Route 90 (Westchester County, New York)
- North Carolina Highway 90
- Ohio State Route 90 (1923) (former)
- Oregon Route 90 (former)
- Pennsylvania Route 90 (1920s-1960s) (former)
- South Carolina Highway 90
- Tennessee State Route 90
- Texas State Highway 90
  - Texas State Highway Loop 90
  - Farm to Market Road 90
- Utah State Route 90
- Virginia State Route 90
- West Virginia Route 90
- Wisconsin Highway 90 (former)
- Wyoming Highway 90

== See also ==
- A90

Preceded by 89	Lists of highways 90	Succeeded by 91
