= Castelo dos Sonhos =

District of Altamira, Brazil

Coordinates: 8°19′00″S 55°06′02″W

- District
- Interactive map of Castelo dos Sonhos
- State: Pará
- Municipality: Altamira

Area
  - Total: 27,977.59 km^{2} (10,802.21 sq mi)

Population
  - Total: 12,000 inhabitants

Castelo dos Sonhos or Castelo de Sonhos (lit. 'Dream Castle') is a district in the municipality of Altamira, in the Brazilian state of Pará. As of the 2010 census, by the Brazilian Institute of Geography and Statistics (IBGE), it had a population of 11,952 and contained 3,240 private households. The district is located about 950 km from the city of Altamira, making it the municipality's most remote district. It was created in August 1990.

Due to its distance from Altamira, Castelo dos Sonhos is more closely connected to the nearby municipalities of Novo Progresso and Guarantã do Norte, in the state of Mato Grosso. The district lies along the BR-163 highway, in the Serra do Cachimbo region, and can be reached via BR-163 and the Trans-Amazonian Highway (BR-230). Altamira's municipal government maintains a local administrative office responsible for managing the area.

== History ==
Castelo dos Sonhos was created in 1990, and its territorial boundaries were later defined by Municipal Law No. 1,634 of 8 September 2006. The district includes indigenous territories, protected areas, and zones of expansion.

The district takes its name from a popular song of the same title, which became widely known in the region.

Migration to the area was encouraged during Brazil’s military government, particularly through the National Integration Program (PIN), established by Decree-Law No. 1,106 on 16 July 1970. The program promoted settlement in the Amazon and led to the construction of the BR-163 highway, connecting the region to other parts of the country.

During the 1970s, families from southern Brazil migrated to the region, many seeking opportunities in cattle ranching. In the 1980s and 1990s, reports of abundant gold deposits triggered further migration from across Brazil, especially from the Northeast and Central-West.

Castelo dos Sonhos gained national attention during the gold rush, partly due to the activities of Márcio Martins, known as "Rambo do Pará," who was associated with violent crimes in the area.

Following the decline of gold mining, the timber industry became one of the district's main economic activities. Since the early 2000s, there have been discussions about municipal emancipation. In 2018, the Legislative Assembly of Pará recognized the viability of this process, followed by a similar decision from the Court of Justice of Pará in 2019.

== Economy ==
Economic activity in Castelo dos Sonhos includes logging, gold mining, soybean cultivation, and local commerce, which plays an important role due to the district's distance from major urban centers.

The district has an estimated cattle herd of approximately 240,000 head, according to ADEPARÁ vaccination data from May 2010, with most cattle belonging to the Nelore breed. Revenue from cattle ranching is largely generated through the sale of animals for slaughter in the neighboring state of Mato Grosso, as the region lacks slaughterhouses operating under official sanitary inspection.

Tourism has also been considered a potential area of development, given the presence of dense forest areas, waterfalls, rivers, and mountainous landscapes in the surrounding region.

== Agriculture ==
Agriculture in Castelo dos Sonhos benefits from the region’s climatic conditions and rainfall patterns, which allow for earlier planting and harvesting compared to other major producing areas in Brazil. The rainy season typically begins in September, enabling rice harvests as early as December and soybean harvests by mid-April.

These conditions support crop rotation and double-cropping systems, particularly involving rice and soybeans, while also reducing the risk of harvest losses associated with heavy rainfall later in the season. The timing of production may provide advantages in market supply, as crops can reach consumers before those from other regions.

After the main harvests, farmers may also plant cover crops, such as sunflower and pigeon pea, to protect the soil and maintain productivity. The state of Pará experiences eight to nine months of regular rainfall, which generally reduces the need for complex irrigation systems compared to neighboring Mato Grosso.

== Geography ==
Castelo dos Sonhos is located in a lowland forest region of southern Pará, characterized by relatively flat terrain and areas of dense vine vegetation (cipoal). The landscape includes numerous small streams, which support both agriculture and cattle ranching.

The district experiences annual rainfall ranging from approximately 2,300 to 3,000 mm, with the rainy season occurring mainly between September and April.

The area is noted for comparatively fertile soils, with higher-than-average phosphorus levels for Brazilian Amazonian soils, which can reduce agricultural production costs. Castelo dos Sonhos is also situated near the Curuá River, one of the region’s main waterways.

== Religion ==
The Parish of Saint Anthony of Padua (Brazilian Portuguese: Paróquia Santo Antônio de Pádua) was established in Castelo dos Sonhos on 26 February 2012, as a separate parish formed from the territory of the Saint Lucy Parish in Novo Progresso. Its first parish priest was Father Josoé Francisco Zanon.
