= 030 (magazine) =

German magazine

[030] Magazin Berlin
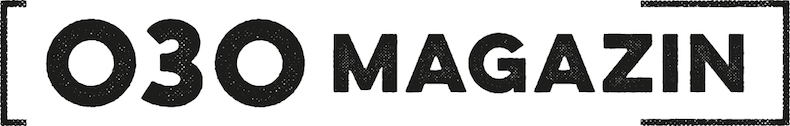
- Owner: elroq entertainment
- Editor-in-chief: Tim Schäfer
- Founded: November 6, 1994; 31 years ago
- Headquarters: Berlin, Germany
- Website: Official website

030 (also known as [030] Magazin Berlin), is a free ad-supported German magazine from Berlin. Its name refers to the dialing code of the city. It was founded on 6 October 1994 and provides information about movies, concerts, parties, sports, and new media. It is distributed in bars, pubs and restaurants and is published every two weeks. The print run is 52,000. The [030] belonged to Zitty Verlag GmbH from 2008 - 2015.

In January 2016, the [030] Magazin website was relaunched. The publisher and editors are located in Berlin-Prenzlauer Berg.
