= Novo Lino =

Municipality of Alagoas, Brazil

- Municipality of Alagoas, Brazil
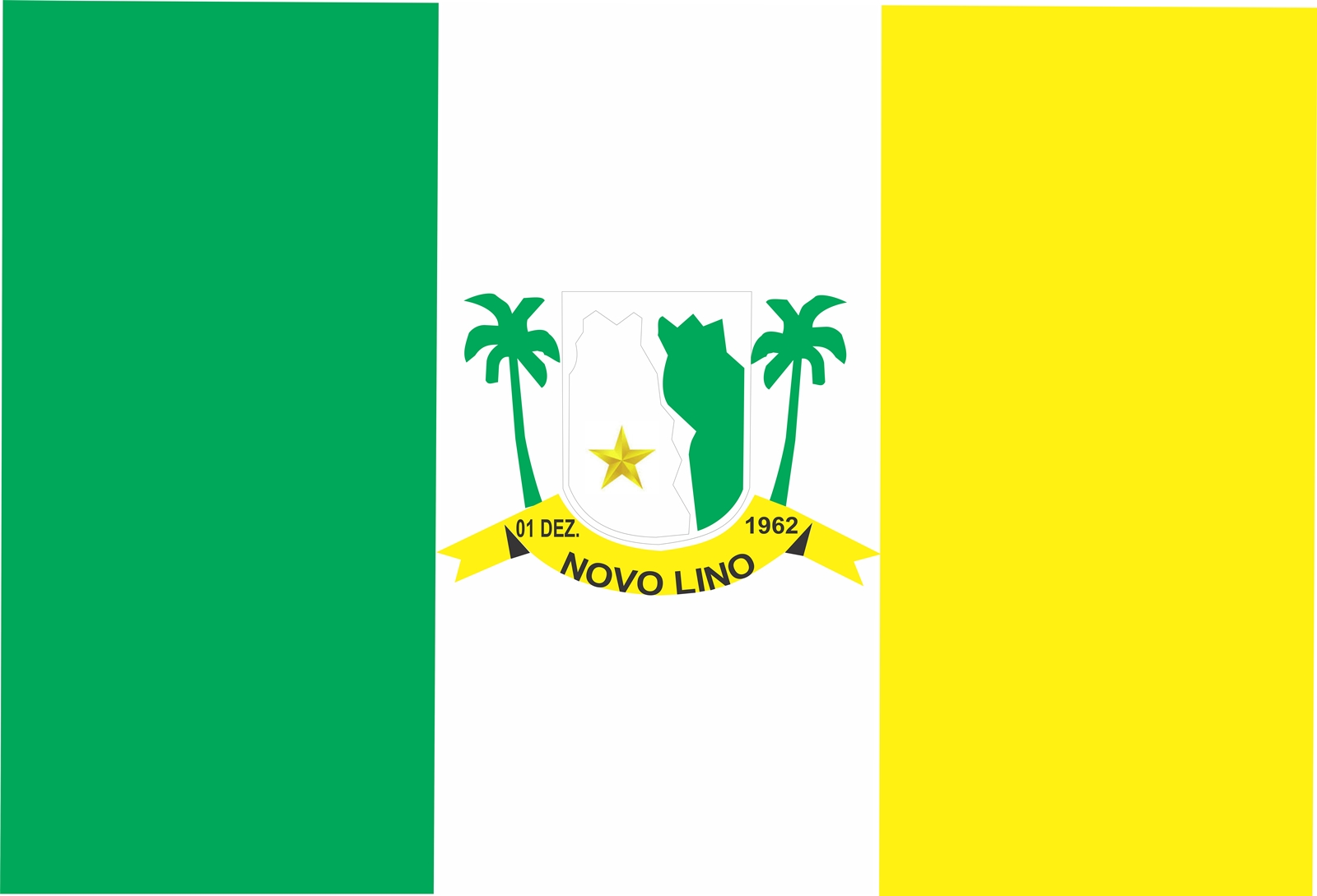
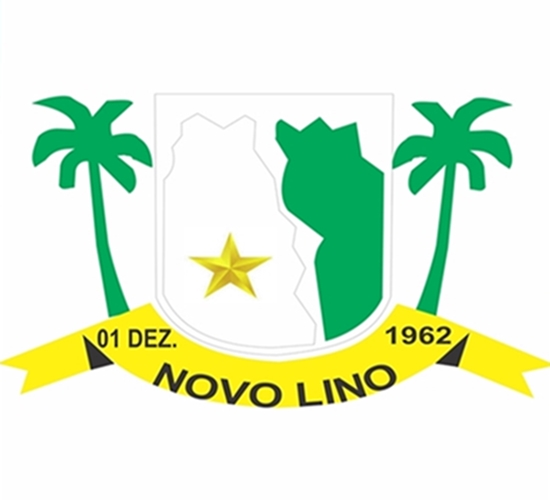
- Flag Coat of arms

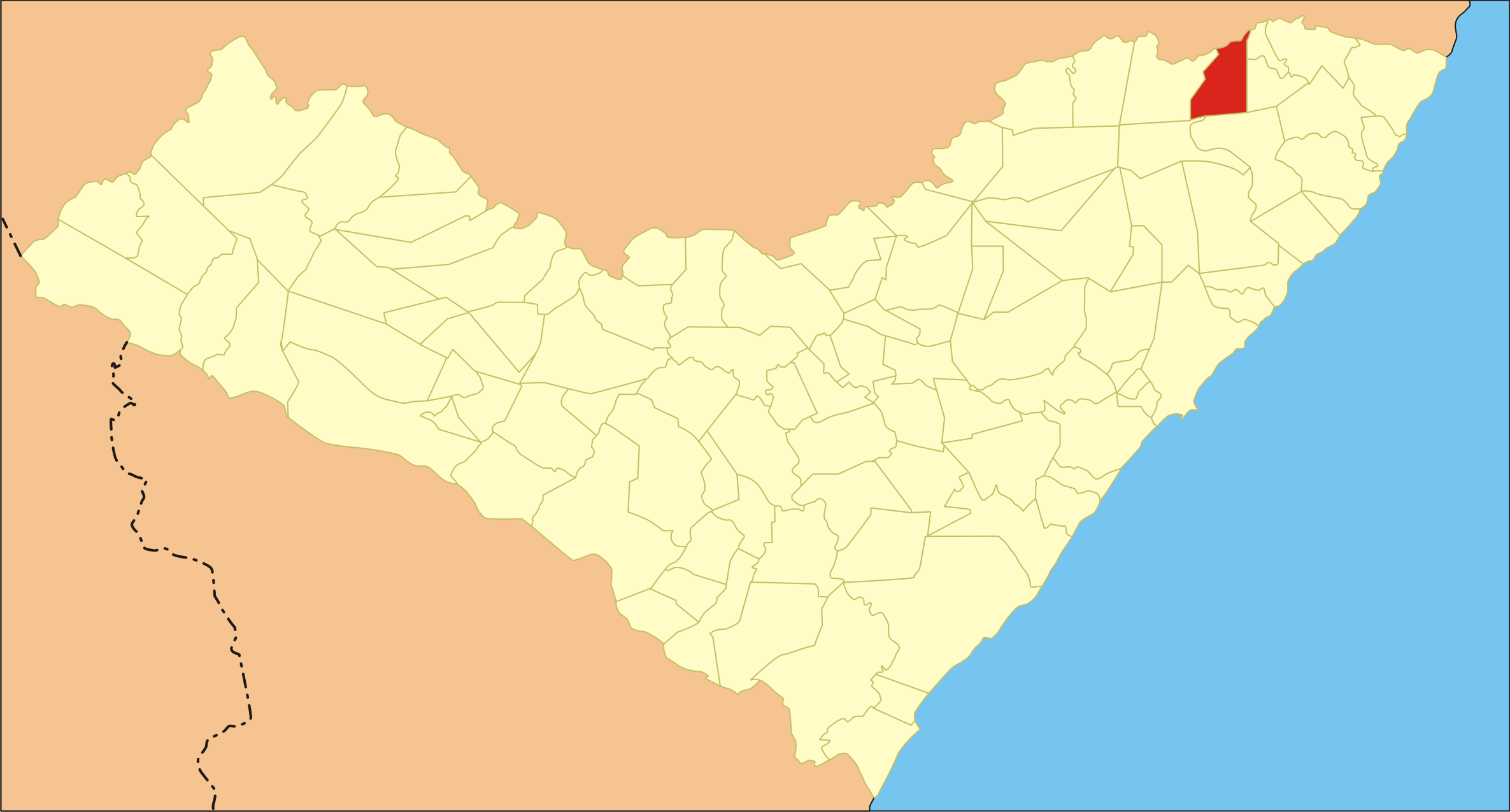
- Location of Novo Lino in Alagoas

- Location within Brazil Location within South America
- Coordinates: 8°56′40″S 35°39′35″W
- Country: Brazil
- Region: Northeast
- State: Alagoas
- Founded: 1 December 1962

Government
  - Mayor: Marcela Silva Gomes de Barros (MDB) (2025-2028)
  - Vice Mayor: Rivaldo da Silva Gomes (MDB) (2025-2028)

Area
  - Total: 219.327 km^{2} (84.683 sq mi)
- Elevation: 148 m (486 ft)

Population (2022)
  - Total: 10,020
  - Density: 46.49/km^{2} (120.4/sq mi)
- Demonym: Novo-linense (Brazilian Portuguese)
- Time zone: UTC-03:00 (Brasília Time)
- Postal code: 57970-000
- HDI (2010): 0.521 – low
- Website: novolino.al.gov.br

Novo Lino (Central northeastern portuguese pronunciation: [ˈnoɦu ˈlinʊ]) is a municipality located in the Brazilian state of Alagoas. Its population is 12,764 (2020) and its area is 182 km^{2} (70 sq mi).

== See also ==
- List of municipalities in Alagoas
