= A90 =

A90 or A-90 may refer to:

- A-90 Orlyonok, a Soviet model of Ekranoplan
- A90 road, a road connecting Edinburgh and Fraserburgh (both in Scotland)
- Boston Consolidated TRACON (designated A90), an FAA Air Traffic Control facility in Merrimack, NH
- Austin A90 motor car, either the Austin Atlantic or Austin Westminster
- Autostrada A90, the orbital motorway that encircles Rome
- Conventional ampere, a unit of measurement, symbol A_{90}
- Dutch Defence, in the Encyclopaedia of Chess Openings
- Hanlin eReader A90, an ebook reader
- Samsung Galaxy A90 5G, smartphone released in 2019
- Toyota Supra ( A90 ), a sports car from Japanese Automaker, Toyota
- A-90, an entity from a Roblox game called "DOORS"
