= Chorozinho =

Municipality in Ceará, Brazil

Coordinates: 4°18′S 38°29′W

- Municipality
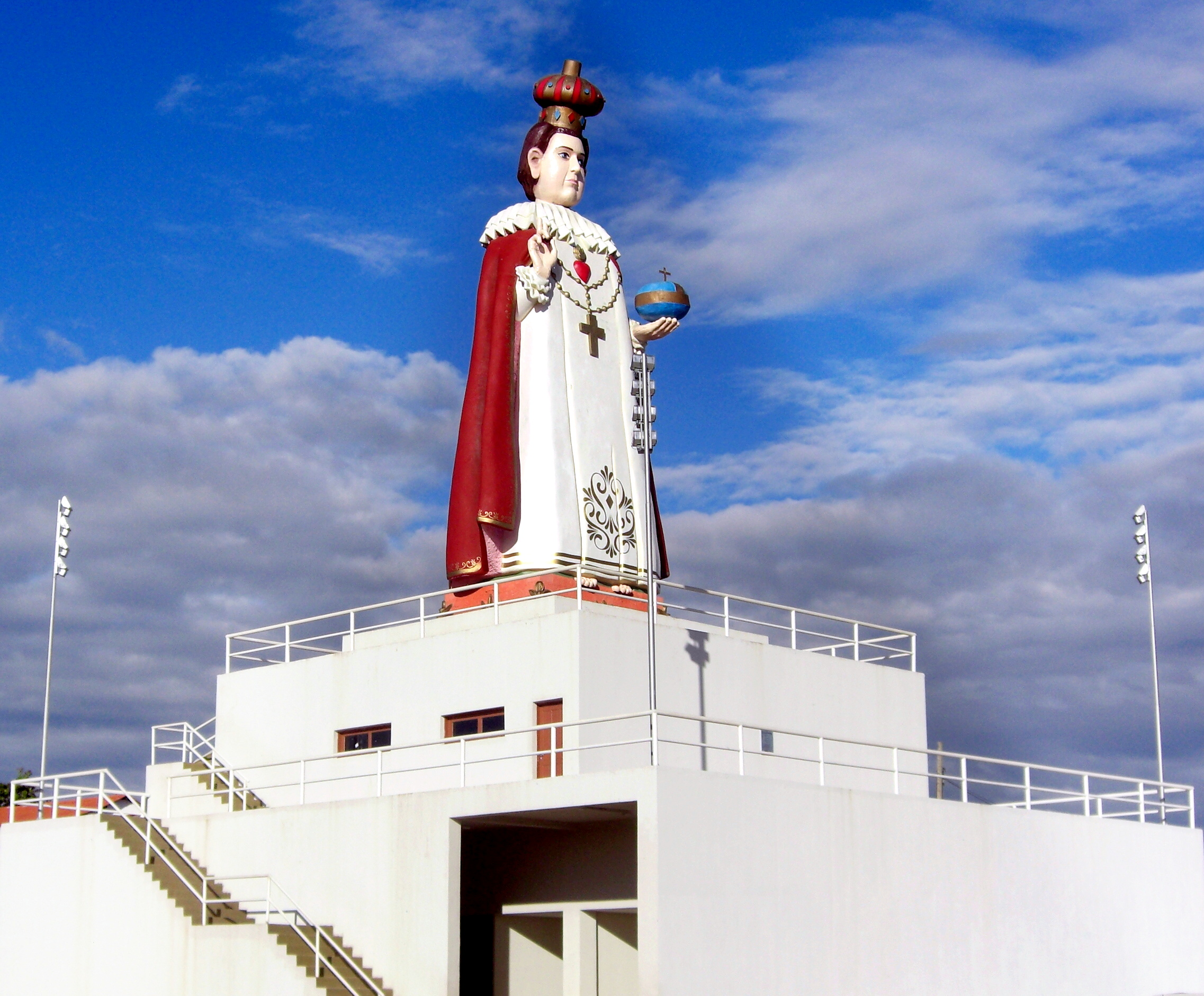

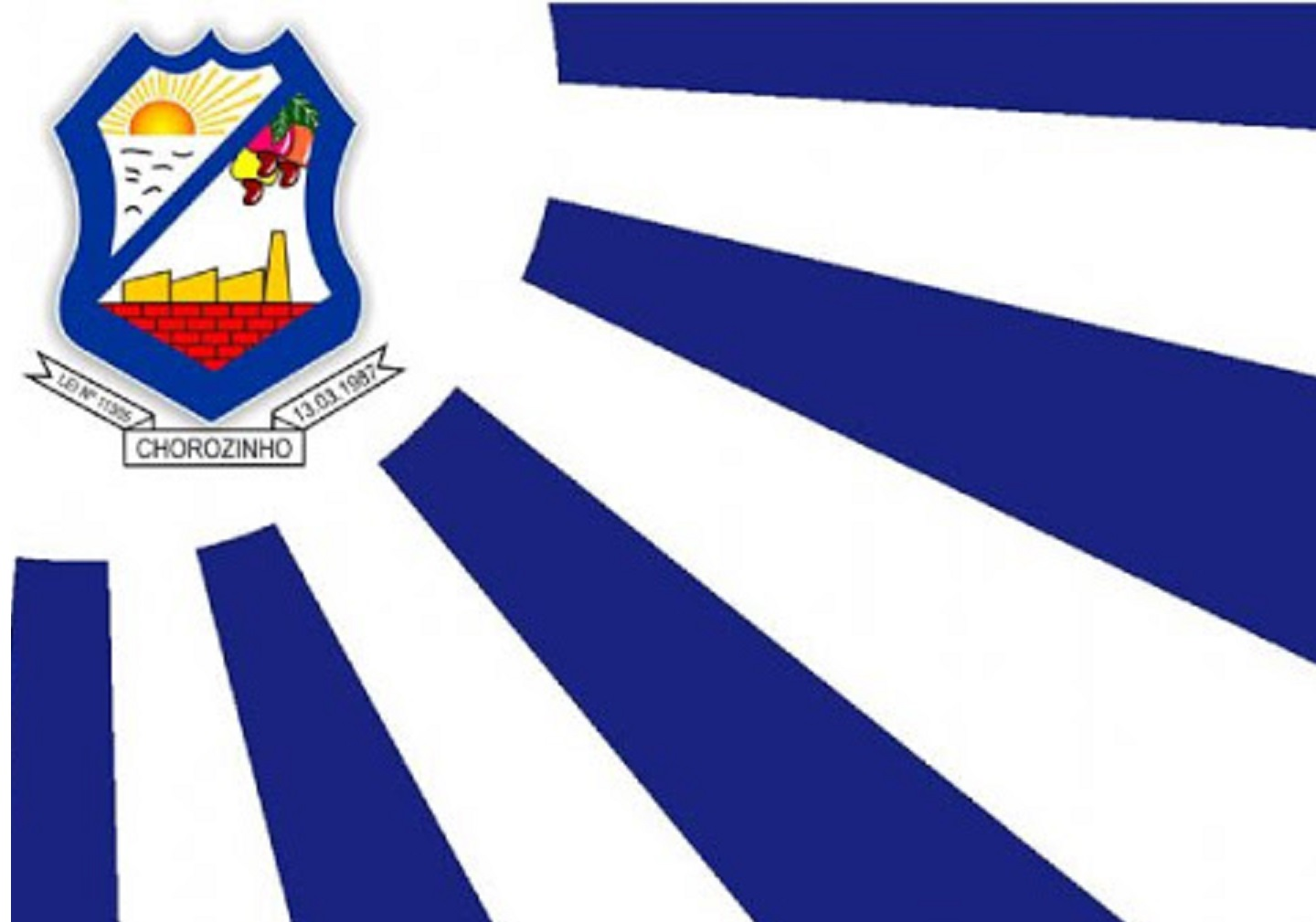
- Flag
- Interactive map of Chorozinho
- Country: Brazil
- Region: Nordeste
- State: Ceará
- Mesoregion: Noroeste Cearense

Area
  - Total: 107.49 sq mi (278.41 km^{2})

Population (2020)
  - Total: 20,274
  - Density: 178/sq mi (68.9/km^{2})
- Time zone: UTC−3 (BRT)

Chorozinho is a municipality in the state of Ceará in the Northeast region of Brazil.

== See also ==
- List of municipalities in Ceará
