= Tenente Portela =

Municipality of Rio Grande do Sul, Brazil

City of Tenente Portela
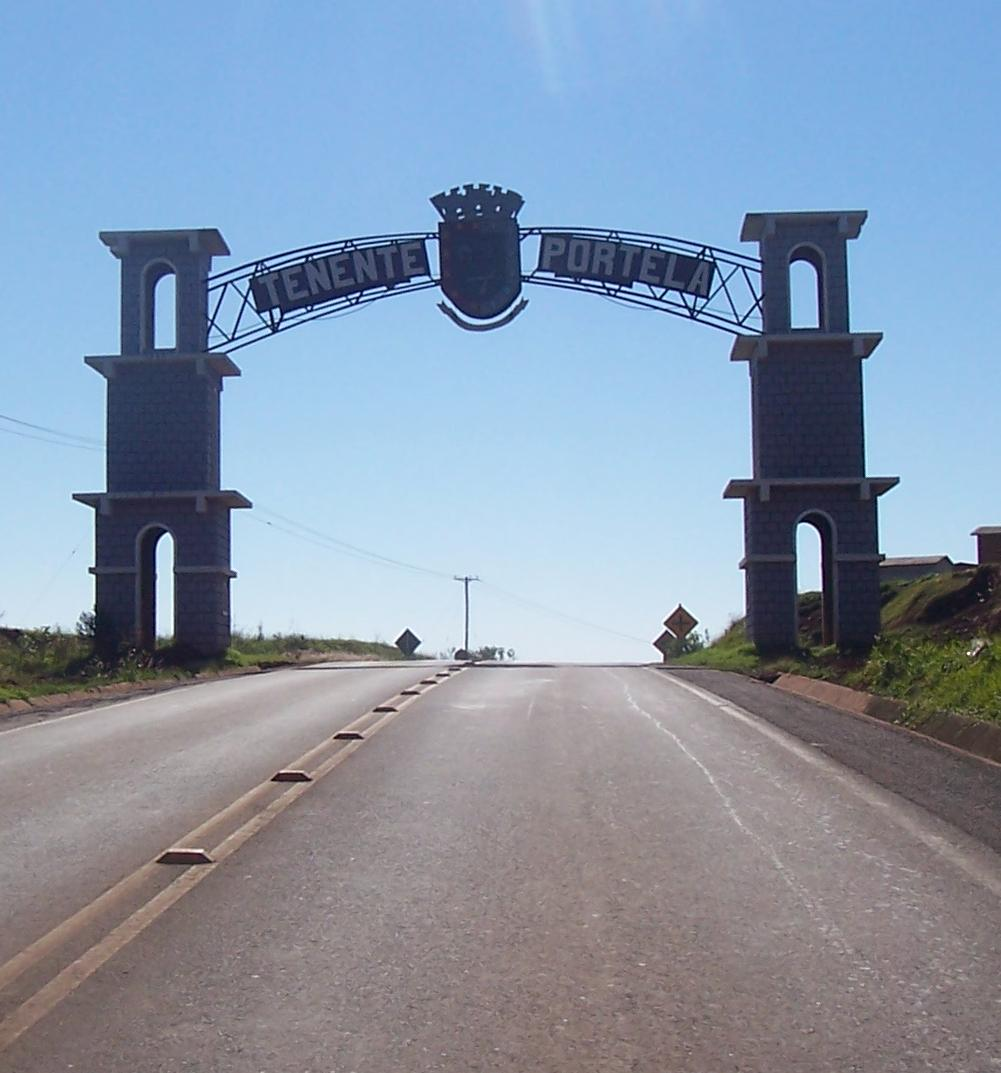

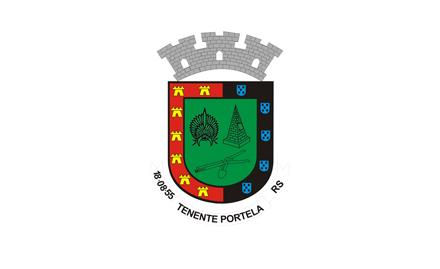
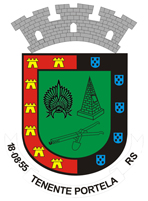
- Flag Coat of arms

- Geograpichal divisions of Rio Grande do Sul. Tenente Portela is highlighted in red.
- Coordinates: 27°22′15″S 53°45′28″W
- Country: Brazil
- State: Rio Grande do Sul
- Incorporated: August 18, 1955

Government
  - Mayor: Rubens Antonio Marroni Furini

Area
  - Total: 337.498 km^{2} (130.309 sq mi)
- Elevation: 390 m (1,280 ft)

Population (2020)
  - Total: 13,434
  - Density: 39.5/km^{2} (102/sq mi)
- Time zone: UTC−3 (BRT)

Tenente Portela is a city in the north-west region of Rio Grande do Sul, the southernmost state of Brazil, with an estimated population of 13,434 inhabitants. The city's geographical coordinates are 27°22′16″S 53°45′30″W, and its elevation is 390 m. Area: 337.5 km².

== See also ==
- List of municipalities in Rio Grande do Sul
