= List of highways in Brazil =

The following is a list of Brazilian highways, sorted by jurisdiction and official number designation.

== List of highways ==
=== Federal District ===
==== Radial highways ====
- DF-001 (Contorno Park Road) (EPCT) [pt]
- DF-002 (Brasília Highway Axis) (Eixão) [pt]
- DF-003 (Industry and Supply Park Road) (EPIA) [pt]
- DF-004 (Estrada Parque das Nações) (EPNA) [pt]
- DF-005 (Parque Paranoá Road) EPPR) [pt]
- DF-006 (Estrada Parque Activities Center) (EPCA) [pt]
- DF-007 (Parque Torto Road) EPTT) [pt]
- DF-008 (Estrada Parque Universidade de Brasília) (EPUB) [pt]
- DF-009 (North Peninsula Park Road) (EPPN) [pt]
- DF-010 (Road Park Supply and Storage) (EPAA) [pt]
- DF-011 (Estrada Parque Indústrias Gráficas) (EPIG) [pt]
- DF-015 (Tamanduá Park Road) (EPTM) [pt]
- DF-025 (Parque Dom Bosco Road) (EPDB) [pt]
- DF-027 (Juscelino Kubitschek Park Road) (EPJK) [pt]
- DF-035 (Cabeça do Veado Park Road) (EPCV) [pt]
- DF-045
- DF-047 (Airport Park Road) (EPAR) [pt]
- DF-051 (Estrada Parque Guará) (EPGU) [pt]
- DF-055 (Parque Vargem Bonita Road) (EPVB) [pt]
- DF-065 (Estrada Parque Ipê) (EPIP) [pt]
- DF-075 (Estrada Parque Núcleo Bandeirante) (EPVP) [pt]
- DF-081 (Interbairros Park Road) (EPIB) [pt]
- DF-085 (Parque Taguatinga Road) (EPTG) [pt]
- DF-087 (Parque Vale Road) (EPVL) [pt]
- DF-095 (Estrada Parque Ceilândia) (EPCL) [pt]
- DF-097 (Park Camp Road) (EPAC) [pt]

==== North-south highways ====
- DF-100
- DF-103
- DF-105
- DF-110
- VC-111
- VC-113
- DF-115
- DF-120
- DF-125
- DF-127
- DF-128
- VC-129
- DF-130
- DF-131
- DF-133
- DF-135
- DF-137
- DF-139
- DF-140
- VC-141
- VC-143
- VC-145
- DF-150
- VC-151
- VC-155
- VC-159
- VC-165
- VC-169
- DF-170
- VC-173
- DF-177
- DF-180
- DF-190

==== East-west highways ====
- VC-201
- DF-205
- DF-206
- DF-215
- DF-220
- DF-230
- DF-240
- DF-249
- DF-250
- VC-257 (Horse Route)
- DF-260
- VC-263
- DF-270
- DF-280
- DF-285
- DF-290
- DF-295

==== Diagonal highways ====
- DF-310
- VC-311
- DF-320
- VC-321
- DF-322
- DF-326
- DF-330
- DF-335
- VC-337
- VC-341
- DF-345
- VC-351
- DF-353
- DF-355
- DF-361
- VC-365
- VC-371
- VC-379
- VC-381
- VC-383
- VC-385

==== Connecting roads ====
- VC-401
- VC-403
- DF-405
- VC-409
- DF-410
- VC-411
- VC-413
- DF-415
- VC-417
- VC-419
- DF-420
- VC-421
- VC-423
- DF-425
- VC-427
- DF-430
- DF-435
- DF-436
- DF-440
- VC-441
- DF-442
- DF-444
- DF-445
- VC-447
- DF-450
- DF-451
- DF-455
- DF-456
- DF-459
- DF-460
- VC-461
- DF-463
- DF-465
- DF-467
- VC-471
- DF-473
- DF-475
- DF-480
- DF-483
- DF-495

==== Highway Branches ====
- VC-505
- DF-511
- VC-527
- DF-533
- VC-541
- VC-547
- VC-555
- VC-561

=== Acre ===
- AC-010 [pt]
- AC-040 [pt]
- AC-090
- AC-101
- AC-102
- AC-104
- AC-105
- AC-115
- AC-170
- AC-186
- AC-190
- AC-321
- AC-329
- AC-339
- AC-370
- AC-378
- AC-380
- AC-400 [pt]
- AC-401 [pt]
- AC-402
- AC-404
- AC-405
- AC-407
- AC-445
- AC-463
- AC-465
- AC-470
- AC-475 [pt]
- AC-482
- AC-485
- AC-495
- AC-498

=== Alagoas ===
- AL-101
- AL-102
- AL-104
- AL-105
- AL-110
- AL-115
- AL-120
- AL-125
- AL-130
- AL-135
- AL-140
- AL-145
- AL-187
- AL-201
- AL-205
- AL-210
- AL-215
- AL-220
- AL-225
- AL-401
- AL-404
- AL-405
- AL-407
- AL-410
- AL-413
- AL-420
- AL-425
- AL-430
- AL-435
- AL-440
- AL-445
- AL-449
- AL-450
- AL-455
- AL-460
- AL-465
- AL-470
- AL-477
- AL-480
- AL-482
- AL-485
- AL-486
- AL-487
- AL-490
- AL-495
- AL-497
- AL-499

=== Amapá ===
- AP-010
- AP-020
- AP-030
- AP-070
- AP-110
- AP-116
- AP-120
- AP-130
- AP-140
- AP-160
- AP-222
- AP-230
- AP-250
- AP-260
- AP-270
- AP-280
- AP-310
- AP-320
- AP-330
- AP-340
- AP-410
- AP-425
- AP-426
- AP-430
- AP-433
- AP-440
- AP-450
- AP-460
- AP-470
- AP-480

=== Amazonas ===
- AM-010 [pt]
- AM-020
- AM-070 [pt]
- AM-151
- AM-170
- AM-174
- AM-175
- AM-239
- AM-240
- AM-249
- AM-254 [pt]
- AM-280
- AM-326
- AM-328
- AM-329
- AM-330
- AM-333
- AM-336
- AM-343
- AM-351
- AM-352 [pt]
- AM-354 [pt]
- AM-356
- AM-360
- AM-362
- AM-363
- AM-364
- AM-366
- AM-374
- AM-378
- AM-449
- AM-450
- AM-451
- AM-452
- AM-453
- AM-464
- AM-466

=== Bahia ===
==== Radial highways ====
- BA-001 [pt]
- BA-002
- BA-026
- BA-028
- BA-046
- BA-052
- BA-084
- BA-093 [pt]
- BA-099

==== North-south highways ====
- BA-101
- BA-120
- BA-126
- BA-130
- BA-131
- BA-142
- BA-144
- BA-148 [pt]
- BA-152
- BA-156
- BA-160 [pt]
- BA-161 [pt]
- BA-172

==== East-west highways ====
- BA-210 [pt]
- BA-220
- BA-225
- BA-233
- BA-242
- BA-245
- BA-250
- BA-251
- BA-262 [pt]
- BA-263
- BA-270
- BA-271
- BA-274
- BA-275
- BA-283
- BA-284
- BA-290
- BA-298

==== Link highways ====
- BA-304
- BA-305
- BA-310
- BA-311
- BA-314
- BA-316
- BA-317
- BA-318
- BA-320
- BA-324
- BA-330
- BA-335
- BA-350
- BA-351
- BA-352
- BA-356
- BA-363
- BA-366
- BA-368
- BA-369
- BA-370
- BA-371
- BA-372
- BA-373
- BA-374
- BA-375
- BA-381
- BA-383
- BA-386
- BA-387
- BA-388
- BA-389
- BA-390
- BA-391
- BA-392
- BA-393
- BA-394
- BA-395
- BA-396
- BA-397
- BA-398
- BA-400
- BA-401
- BA-402
- BA-403
- BA-404
- BA-407
- BA-408
- BA-409
- BA-410
- BA-411
- BA-412
- BA-413
- BA-414
- BA-416
- BA-417
- BA-418
- BA-419
- BA-420
- BA-421
- BA-422
- BA-424
- BA-425
- BA-426
- BA-427
- BA-428
- BA-429
- BA-430
- BA-431
- BA-432
- BA-433
- BA-434
- BA-435
- BA-438
- BA-441
- BA-447
- BA-449
- BA-451
- BA-452
- BA-453
- BA-454
- BA-455
- BA-458
- BA-459
- BA-460
- BA-461
- BA-462
- BA-463
- BA-464
- BA-465
- BA-466 [pt]
- BA-470
- BA-471
- BA-475
- BA-476
- BA-477
- BA-479
- BA-480
- BA-483
- BA-484
- BA-485
- BA-486
- BA-487
- BA-488
- BA-489
- BA-490
- BA-491
- BA-492
- BA-493
- BA-494
- BA-495
- BA-496
- BA-497
- BA-499
- BA-500
- BA-501
- BA-502
- BA-503
- BA-504
- BA-505
- BA-506
- BA-507
- BA-508
- BA-509
- BA-510
- BA-511
- BA-512
- BA-513
- BA-515
- BA-516
- BA-517
- BA-518
- BA-519
- BA-520
- BA-521
- BA-522
- BA-523
- BA-524 [pt]
- BA-525
- BA-526 [pt]
- BA-527
- BA-528 [pt]
- BA-529
- BA-530 [pt]
- BA-531
- BA-532
- BA-533
- BA-534
- BA-535 [pt]
- BA-536
- BA-537 [pt]
- BA-538
- BA-539
- BA-540
- BA-541
- BA-542
- BA-543
- BA-544
- BA-545
- BA-547
- BA-548
- BA-549 [pt]
- BA-550
- BA-551
- BA-552
- BA-553
- BA-554
- BA-555
- BA-556
- BA-557
- BA-558
- BA-559
- BA-560
- BA-561
- BA-562
- BA-563
- BA-564
- BA-569
- BA-572
- BA-573
- BA-574
- BA-575
- BA-576
- BA-582
- BA-583
- BA-594
- BA-601
- BA-611
- BA-612
- BA-614
- BA-617
- BA-623
- BA-625
- BA-630
- BA-632
- BA-633
- BA-634
- BA-635
- BA-636
- BA-637
- BA-638
- BA-639
- BA-640
- BA-641
- BA-642
- BA-643
- BA-644
- BA-645
- BA-646
- BA-647
- BA-648
- BA-649
- BA-650
- BA-651
- BA-652
- BA-653
- BA-654
- BA-655
- BA-656
- BA-657
- BA-659
- BA-660
- BA-661
- BA-662
- BA-663
- BA-664
- BA-665
- BA-667
- BA-668
- BA-669
- BA-670
- BA-671
- BA-672
- BA-676
- BA-678
- BA-680
- BA-682
- BA-683
- BA-684
- BA-685
- BA-686
- BA-687
- BA-688
- BA-690
- BA-693
- BA-695
- BA-696
- BA-697
- BA-698
- BA-699

==== Highway branches ====
- BA-700
- BA-709
- BA-714
- BA-715
- BA-717
- BA-722
- BA-723
- BA-724
- BA-725
- BA-752
- BA-758
- BA-771
- BA-772
- BA-774
- BA-776
- BA-777
- BA-778
- BA-779
- BA-781
- BA-782
- BA-784
- BA-787
- BA-788
- BA-791 [pt]
- BA-797
- BA-798
- BA-800
- BA-801
- BA-802
- BA-825
- BA-826
- BA-827
- BA-836
- BA-839
- BA-840
- BA-841
- BA-846
- BA-847
- BA-848
- BA-849
- BA-850
- BA-851
- BA-852
- BA-853
- BA-854
- BA-856
- BA-857
- BA-858
- BA-861
- BA-862
- BA-863
- BA-866
- BA-867
- BA-868
- BA-878
- BA-880
- BA-882
- BA-883
- BA-884
- BA-885
- BA-886
- BA-887
- BA-888
- BA-889
- BA-891
- BA-892
- BA-893
- BA-894
- BA-895
- BA-896
- BA-898
- BA-900
- BA-903
- BA-904
- BA-905
- BA-920
- BA-923
- BA-927
- BA-936
- BA-937
- BA-938
- BA-939
- BA-940
- BA-941
- BA-943
- BA-953
- BA-958
- BA-959
- BA-962
- BA-963
- BA-964
- BA-968
- BA-969
- BA-972
- BA-973
- BA-974
- BA-978
- BA-980
- BA-981
- BA-982
- BA-983
- BA-984
- BA-985
- BA-986
- BA-987
- BA-992
- BA-994
- BA-996
- BA-997
- BA-999

=== Ceará ===
- CE-010 [pt]
- CE-020
- CE-021
- CE-025
- CE-031
- CE-040
- CE-060
- CE-062
- CE-065
- CE-071
- CE-082
- CE-085
- CE-090
- CE-113
- CE-116
- CE-117
- CE-123
- CE-138
- CE-139
- CE-148
- CE-151
- CE-152
- CE-153
- CE-155
- CE-156
- CE-161
- CE-162
- CE-163
- CE-166
- CE-168
- CE-169
- CE-173
- CE-176
- CE-177
- CE-178
- CE-179
- CE-180
- CE-182
- CE-183
- CE-187
- CE-189
- CE-192
- CE-201
- CE-204
- CE-206
- CE-207
- CE-208
- CE-213
- CE-215
- CE-216
- CE-223
- CE-232
- CE-235
- CE-240 [pt]
- CE-241
- CE-243 [pt]
- CE-251
- CE-252
- CE-253
- CE-257
- CE-261
- CE-263
- CE-265
- CE-266
- CE-267
- CE-269
- CE-273
- CE-275
- CE-276
- CE-277
- CE-278
- CE-279
- CE-282
- CE-284
- CE-285
- CE-286
- CE-288
- CE-290
- CE-292
- CE-293
- CE-298
- CE-311
- CE-313
- CE-317
- CE-319
- CE-321
- CE-323
- CE-325
- CE-327
- CE-329
- CE-333
- CE-341
- CE-346
- CE-348
- CE-350
- CE-351
- CE-352
- CE-353
- CE-354
- CE-356
- CE-358
- CE-359
- CE-360
- CE-362
- CE-363
- CE-364
- CE-366
- CE-368 [pt]
- CE-371
- CE-373
- CE-375
- CE-377
- CE-378
- CE-380
- CE-384
- CE-385
- CE-386
- CE-387
- CE-388
- CE-390
- CE-393
- CE-395
- CE-397
- CE-401
- CE-402
- CE-403
- CE-404
- CE-405
- CE-413
- CE-414
- CE-417
- CE-418
- CE-421
- CE-422
- CE-423
- CE-425
- CE-426
- CE-427
- CE-428
- CE-432
- CE-433
- CE-434
- CE-438
- CE-440
- CE-441
- CE-442
- CE-443
- CE-444
- CE-445
- CE-446
- CE-447
- CE-448
- CE-449
- CE-450
- CE-451
- CE-452
- CE-453
- CE-454
- CE-455
- CE-456
- CE-457
- CE-458
- CE-459
- CE-461
- CE-462
- CE-463
- CE-464
- CE-467
- CE-469
- CE-470
- CE-471
- CE-473
- CE-475
- CE-476
- CE-479
- CE-480
- CE-481
- CE-482
- CE-483
- CE-484
- CE-485
- CE-486
- CE-487
- CE-488
- CE-489
- CE-490
- CE-491
- CE-492
- CE-493
- CE-494
- CE-495
- CE-496
- CE-497
- CE-499
- CE-501
- CE-502
- CE-503
- CE-504
- CE-505
- CE-506
- CE-507
- CE-508
- CE-509
- CE-510
- CE-511
- CE-512
- CE-513
- CE-514
- CE-515
- CE-516
- CE-517
- CE-518
- CE-519
- CE-520
- CE-521
- CE-522
- CE-523
- CE-524 [pt]
- CE-525 [pt]
- CE-526
- CE-527
- CE-528
- CE-529
- CE-530
- CE-531
- CE-532
- CE-533
- CE-534
- CE-535
- CE-536
- CE-537
- CE-538
- CE-539
- CE-540
- CE-541
- CE-542
- CE-543
- CE-544
- CE-545
- CE-546
- CE-547
- CE-548
- CE-549
- CE-550
- CE-551
- CE-552
- CE-553
- CE-554
- CE-555
- CE-556
- CE-557
- CE-558
- CE-559
- CE-560
- CE-561
- CE-562
- CE-563
- CE-564
- CE-565
- CE-566
- CE-567
- CE-568
- CE-569
- CE-570
- CE-571
- CE-572
- CE-573
- CE-574
- CE-575
- CE-576
- CE-577
- CE-578
- CE-579
- CE-580
- CE-581
- CE-582
- CE-583
- CE-584
- CE-585 [pt]
- CE-586
- CE-587
- CE-588
- CE-589
- CE-590
- CE-591
- CE-592
- CE-593
- CE-594
- CE-595
- CE-596
- CE-597
- CE-598
- CE-599
- CE-601
- CE-602
- CE-603
- CE-604

Aracati

- AR-010
- AR-020 - Estrada Da Beirada
- AR-040
- AR-050
- AR-101
- AR-105
- AR-125
- AR-145
- AR-165
- AR-185
- AR-288
- AR-290
- AR-295
- AR-405
- AR-425
- AR-426
- AR-445
- AR-465

=== Espírito Santo ===
==== Radial highways ====
- ES-010: From Vitória to Northern Beach Cities [pt]
- ES-020
- ES-060: Rodovia do Sol – From Vitória to Southern Beach cities [pt]
- ES-080 [pt]

==== North-south highways ====
- ES-115 [pt]
- ES-120 [pt]
- ES-124 [pt]
- ES-130 [pt]
- ES-137
- ES-146
- ES-162
- ES-164
- ES-165
- ES-166 [pt]
- ES-177
- ES-181
- ES-185
- ES-190

==== East-west highways ====
- ES-209
- ES-220
- ES-245
- ES-248 [pt]
- ES-257
- ES-260
- ES-261 [pt]
- ES-264 [pt]
- ES-289
- ES-297

==== Diagonal highways ====
- ES-313 [pt]
- ES-315 [pt]
- ES-318 [pt]
- ES-320
- ES-334
- ES-341
- ES-344 [pt]
- ES-355
- ES-356 [pt]
- ES-357
- ES-358
- ES-360
- ES-365
- ES-368
- ES-375
- ES-376
- ES-379
- ES-381
- ES-383
- ES-387
- ES-388
- ES-391

==== Link highways ====
- ES-405 [pt]
- ES-413
- ES-416 [pt]
- ES-418 [pt]
- ES-421 [pt]
- ES-422 [pt]
- ES-423
- ES-426
- ES-428
- ES-429 [pt]
- ES-430
- ES-432
- ES-434
- ES-436
- ES-440
- ES-442
- ES-445
- ES-446
- ES-448
- ES-450
- ES-452
- ES-456
- ES-460
- ES-462
- ES-465
- ES-466
- ES-468
- ES-469
- ES-470
- ES-471
- ES-472
- ES-473
- ES-474
- ES-475
- ES-476
- ES-477
- ES-478
- ES-479
- ES-480
- ES-481
- ES-482
- ES-483
- ES-484
- ES-485
- ES-486
- ES-487
- ES-488
- ES-489
- ES-490
- ES-491
- ES-492
- ES-493
- ES-494
- ES-495
- ES-496

=== Goiás ===
==== Radial highways ====
- GO-010
- GO-020
- GO-021
- GO-026
- GO-040
- GO-050
- GO-060
- GO-070 [pt]
- GO-080

==== North-south highways ====
- GO-108
- GO-110
- GO-112 [pt]
- GO-114
- GO-116
- GO-118 [pt]
- GO-132 [pt]
- GO-139
- GO-142
- GO-147
- GO-151
- GO-154
- GO-156
- GO-162
- GO-164 [pt]
- GO-173
- GO-174 [pt]
- GO-178
- GO-180
- GO-184
- GO-188
- GO-194

==== East-west highways ====
- GO-206
- GO-210
- GO-213
- GO-215
- GO-217
- GO-219
- GO-220
- GO-221 [pt]
- GO-222
- GO-225
- GO-230
- GO-236
- GO-237 [pt]
- GO-239
- GO-241
- GO-244

==== Diagonal highways ====
- GO-301
- GO-302
- GO-305 [pt]
- GO-306
- GO-307
- GO-309
- GO-319
- GO-320
- GO-324
- GO-325
- GO-326
- GO-330 [pt]
- GO-333
- GO-334
- GO-336
- GO-338
- GO-341
- GO-342
- GO-346
- GO-347
- GO-352
- GO-353

==== Link highways ====
- GO-401
- GO-402
- GO-403
- GO-404
- GO-405
- GO-406
- GO-407
- GO-408
- GO-409
- GO-410
- GO-411
- GO-412
- GO-413
- GO-414
- GO-415
- GO-416
- GO-417
- GO-418
- GO-419
- GO-420
- GO-421
- GO-422
- GO-423
- GO-424
- GO-425
- GO-426
- GO-427
- GO-428
- GO-429
- GO-430
- GO-431
- GO-432
- GO-433
- GO-434
- GO-435
- GO-436
- GO-437
- GO-438
- GO-439
- GO-440
- GO-441
- GO-442
- GO-443
- GO-444
- GO-445
- GO-446
- GO-447
- GO-448
- GO-449
- GO-450
- GO-451
- GO-452
- GO-453
- GO-454
- GO-455
- GO-456
- GO-457
- GO-458
- GO-459
- GO-460
- GO-461
- GO-462
- GO-463
- GO-464
- GO-465
- GO-466
- GO-467
- GO-468
- GO-469
- GO-470
- GO-471
- GO-472
- GO-473
- GO-474
- GO-475
- GO-476
- GO-477
- GO-478
- GO-479 [pt]
- GO-480
- GO-481
- GO-482
- GO-483
- GO-484
- GO-485
- GO-486
- GO-487
- GO-488
- GO-489
- GO-498
- GO-499

==== Highway branches ====
- GO-500
- GO-501
- GO-502
- GO-503
- GO-504
- GO-505
- GO-506
- GO-508
- GO-509
- GO-510
- GO-511
- GO-512
- GO-513
- GO-514
- GO-515
- GO-516
- GO-517
- GO-518
- GO-519
- GO-520
- GO-521
- GO-522
- GO-523
- GO-524
- GO-525
- GO-526
- GO-527
- GO-528
- GO-529
- GO-530
- GO-531
- GO-532
- GO-533
- GO-534
- GO-535
- GO-536
- GO-537
- GO-538
- GO-539
- GO-540
- GO-541
- GO-542
- GO-543
- GO-544
- GO-545
- GO-546
- GO-547
- GO-548
- GO-549
- GO-550
- GO-551
- GO-552
- GO-553
- GO-554
- GO-555
- GO-556
- GO-557
- GO-558
- GO-559
- GO-560
- GO-561
- GO-562
- GO-563
- GO-564
- GO-565
- GO-566
- GO-567
- GO-568
- GO-569
- GO-570
- GO-571
- GO-572
- GO-573
- GO-574
- GO-575
- GO-576
- GO-585
- GO-587
- GO-591
- GO-592
- GO-593
- GO-594
- GO-595
- GO-596
- GO-597

=== Maranhão ===
- MA-006
- MA-007
- MA-008
- MA-009
- MA-012
- MA-014
- MA-020
- MA-025
- MA-026
- MA-027
- MA-034
- MA-036
- MA-040
- MA-101
- MA-106
- MA-110
- MA-119
- MA-122
- MA-123
- MA-127
- MA-132
- MA-133
- MA-134
- MA-138
- MA-140
- MA-141
- MA-201 (Estrada de Ribamar) [pt]
- MA-202 (Estrada da Maioba) [pt]
- MA-203
- MA-204
- MA-205
- MA-206
- MA-207 (Via Expressa) [pt]
- MA-208 (Av. Litorânea) [pt]
- MA-209
- MA-211
- MA-212
- MA-214
- MA-216
- MA-224
- MA-225
- MA-227
- MA-228
- MA-235
- MA-240
- MA-245
- MA-247
- MA-256
- MA-259
- MA-262
- MA-270
- MA-271
- MA-272
- MA-274
- MA-275
- MA-278
- MA-280
- MA-281
- MA-282
- MA-301
- MA-302
- MA-303
- MA-304
- MA-305
- MA-306
- MA-307
- MA-309
- MA-310
- MA-311
- MA-312
- MA-313
- MA-314
- MA-315
- MA-317
- MA-318
- MA-319
- MA-320
- MA-321
- MA-322
- MA-323
- MA-324
- MA-325
- MA-326
- MA-327
- MA-328
- MA-329
- MA-331
- MA-332
- MA-333
- MA-334
- MA-335
- MA-336
- MA-337
- MA-338
- MA-339
- MA-341
- MA-342
- MA-345
- MA-346
- MA-349
- MA-352
- MA-354
- MA-360
- MA-362
- MA-363
- MA-364
- MA-368
- MA-369
- MA-371
- MA-372
- MA-373
- MA-374
- MA-375
- MA-376
- MA-378
- MA-379
- MA-380
- MA-381
- MA-382
- MA-383
- MA-384
- MA-386 (Estrada Da Arroz)
- MA-387
- MA-401
- MA-402
- MA-403
- MA-423
- MA-429
- MA-432
- MA-446
- MA-456
- MA-463

=== Mato Grosso ===
- MT-010
- MT-020
- MT-030
- MT-040
- MT-045
- MT-050 (Leôncio Lopes de Miranda Highway) [pt]
- MT-060 (Transpantaneira)
- MT-100
- MT-107
- MT-109
- MT-110
- MT-130
- MT-140
- MT-160
- MT-170
- MT-180
- MT-198
- MT-199
- MT-208 [pt]
- MT-220
- MT-225
- MT-235
- MT-240
- MT-241
- MT-242
- MT-243
- MT-244
- MT-245
- MT-246
- MT-247
- MT-248
- MT-249
- MT-250
- MT-251
- MT-260
- MT-265
- MT-270
- MT-280
- MT-299
- MT-311
- MT-313
- MT-319
- MT-320
- MT-322
- MT-323
- MT-324
- MT-325
- MT-326
- MT-328
- MT-329
- MT-334
- MT-336
- MT-338
- MT-339
- MT-340
- MT-343
- MT-344
- MT-351
- MT-352
- MT-358
- MT-361
- MT-364
- MT-370
- MT-373
- MT-383
- MT-388
- MT-389
- MT-401
- MT-402
- MT-403
- MT-404
- MT-405
- MT-406
- MT-407
- MT-408
- MT-409
- MT-410
- MT-411
- MT-412
- MT-413
- MT-414
- MT-415
- MT-416
- MT-417
- MT-418
- MT-419
- MT-420
- MT-421
- MT-422
- MT-423
- MT-424
- MT-425
- MT-426
- MT-427
- MT-428
- MT-429
- MT-430
- MT-431
- MT-432
- MT-433
- MT-434
- MT-435
- MT-436
- MT-437
- MT-438
- MT-439
- MT-440
- MT-441
- MT-442
- MT-443
- MT-444
- MT-445
- MT-446
- MT-447
- MT-448
- MT-449 [pt]
- MT-450
- MT-451
- MT-452
- MT-453
- MT-454
- MT-455
- MT-456
- MT-457
- MT-458
- MT-459
- MT-460
- MT-461
- MT-462
- MT-463
- MT-464
- MT-465
- MT-466
- MT-467
- MT-468
- MT-469
- MT-470
- MT-471
- MT-472
- MT-473
- MT-474
- MT-475
- MT-476
- MT-477
- MT-478
- MT-479
- MT-480
- MT-481
- MT-482
- MT-483
- MT-484
- MT-485
- MT-486
- MT-487
- MT-488
- MT-489
- MT-490
- MT-491
- MT-492
- MT-493
- MT-494
- MT-495
- MT-498
- MT-499
- MT-500
- MT-501
- MT-502
- MT-503
- MT-505
- MT-510
- MT-515
- MT-520
- MT-530
- MT-540
- MT-550
- MT-551
- MT-560
- MT-570

=== Mato Grosso do Sul ===
- MS-010
- MS-040
- MS-060
- MS-080
- MS-112
- MS-124
- MS-134
- MS-135
- MS-141
- MS-142
- MS-145
- MS-147
- MS-156
- MS-157
- MS-160
- MS-162
- MS-164
- MS-165
- MS-166
- MS-170
- MS-178
- MS-180
- MS-184
- MS-185
- MS-195
- MS-197
- MS-213
- MS-214
- MS-215
- MS-217
- MS-223
- MS-228
- MS-229
- MS-240
- MS-243
- MS-244
- MS-245
- MS-258
- MS-260
- MS-267
- MS-270
- MS-274
- MS-276
- MS-278
- MS-279
- MS-280
- MS-283
- MS-286
- MS-289
- MS-290
- MS-295
- MS-299
- MS-306
- MS-307
- MS-310
- MS-316
- MS-320
- MS-322
- MS-324
- MS-325
- MS-337
- MS-338
- MS-339
- MS-340
- MS-345
- MS-347
- MS-351
- MS-352
- MS-355
- MS-356
- MS-357
- MS-364
- MS-375
- MS-377
- MS-378
- MS-379
- MS-380
- MS-382
- MS-384
- MS-385
- MS-386
- MS-395
- MS-407
- MS-418
- MS-419
- MS-422
- MS-423
- MS-424
- MS-425
- MS-426
- MS-427
- MS-428
- MS-429
- MS-430
- MS-431
- MS-432
- MS-433
- MS-434
- MS-435
- MS-436
- MS-437
- MS-438
- MS-440
- MS-441
- MS-442
- MS-443
- MS-444
- MS-445
- MS-446
- MS-447
- MS-448
- MS-449
- MS-450
- MS-452
- MS-453
- MS-454
- MS-455
- MS-456
- MS-458
- MS-459
- MS-460
- MS-462
- MS-464
- MS-465
- MS-466
- MS-467
- MS-468
- MS-469
- MS-470
- MS-471
- MS-472
- MS-473
- MS-474
- MS-475
- MS-476
- MS-477
- MS-478
- MS-479
- MS-480
- MS-481
- MS-483
- MS-485
- MS-486
- MS-487
- MS-488
- MS-489
- MS-497

=== Pará ===
- PA-020 (Liberdade Avenue) [pt]
- PA-102
- PA-108
- PA-112 (Dom Eliseu Corolli Highway) [pt]
- PA-124 [pt]
- PA-125 [pt]
- PA-127 [pt]
- PA-136 [pt]
- PA-140 [pt]
- PA-150 (Paulo Fontelles Highway) [pt]
- PA-151 [pt]
- PA-154 [pt]
- PA-156
- PA-157
- PA-158
- PA-159
- PA-160 [pt]
- PA-167 [pt]
- PA-192 [pt]
- PA-220 [pt]
- PA-235 [pt]
- PA-238 [pt]
- PA-241 [pt]
- PA-242 [pt]
- PA-251
- PA-252 [pt]
- PA-253 [pt]
- PA-254 [pt]
- PA-255 [pt]
- PA-256 [pt]
- PA-257 [pt]
- PA-258
- PA-260
- PA-263 [pt]
- PA-265
- PA-268
- PA-275 [pt]
- PA-279 [pt]
- PA-287 [pt]
- PA-318 [pt]
- PA-320 [pt]
- PA-322 [pt]
- PA-324 [pt]
- PA-326
- PA-327 [pt]
- PA-364
- PA-368
- PA-370 [pt]
- PA-371
- PA-375
- PA-378
- PA-391 (Engenheiro Augusto Meira Filho Highway) [pt]
- PA-392
- PA-393
- PA-395 [pt]
- PA-396
- PA-403 [pt]
- PA-404 [pt]
- PA-405 [pt]
- PA-406 (Cupuaçu Road) [pt]
- PA-407 (Açaí Highway) [pt]
- PA-408 [pt]
- PA-409 [pt]
- PA-411 [pt]
- PA-412 [pt]
- PA-415 (Ernesto Aciolli Highway)
- PA-417
- PA-418
- PA-419 [pt]
- PA-420
- PA-422
- PA-423 [pt]
- PA-424
- PA-426
- PA-427 [pt]
- PA-428
- PA-429 [pt]
- PA-430
- PA-431 [pt]
- PA-433 [pt]
- PA-434
- PA-437
- PA-438
- PA-439 [pt]
- PA-441
- PA-442
- PA-443
- PA-444
- PA-445
- PA-446 [pt]
- PA-447
- PA-448
- PA-449 [pt]
- PA-450
- PA-451
- PA-453 (Engenheiro Fernando Guilhon Highway) [pt]
- PA-454 [pt]
- PA-456
- PA-457 (Everaldo Martins Highway) [pt]
- PA-458 [pt]
- PA-459 [pt]
- PA-461 [pt]
- PA-462
- PA-463 [pt]
- PA-464
- PA-466
- PA-467 [pt]
- PA-469 [pt]
- PA-471
- PA-473
- PA-475 [pt]
- PA-477 (Piçarreira Highway) [pt]
- PA-480 [pt]
- PA-481 [pt]
- PA-482
- PA-483 (Road Loop of Pará) [pt]
- PA-485
- PA-489

=== Paraíba ===
- PB-004 [pt]
- PB-008
- PB-011
- PB-016 [pt]
- PB-018
- PB-019
- PB-025
- PB-027
- PB-028
- PB-030
- PB-032
- PB-033
- PB-034
- PB-035
- PB-041
- PB-042
- PB-044
- PB-045
- PB-048
- PB-051
- PB-054
- PB-057
- PB-061
- PB-063
- PB-065
- PB-069
- PB-067
- PB-071
- PB-073
- PB-075
- PB-077
- PB-079
- PB-081
- PB-082
- PB-085
- PB-087
- PB-089
- PB-090
- PB-092
- PB-093
- PB-095
- PB-097
- PB-099
- PB-100
- PB-101
- PB-102
- PB-103
- PB-105
- PB-107
- PB-109
- PB-111 [pt]
- PB-113
- PB-115 [pt]
- PB-121
- PB-127
- PB-132
- PB-133
- PB-135
- PB-137
- PB-138
- PB-148
- PB-150
- PB-151
- PB-157
- PB-160
- PB-167
- PB-169
- PB-176 [pt]
- PB-177
- PB-186
- PB-195
- PB-196 [pt]
- PB-198
- PB-200
- PB-202
- PB-210
- PB-214
- PB-216
- PB-221
- PB-224
- PB-226 [pt]
- PB-228
- PB-233 [pt]
- PB-238
- PB-240
- PB-242
- PB-246
- PB-248
- PB-250
- PB-251
- PB-252
- PB-262
- PB-264
- PB-275
- PB-276 [pt]
- PB-293
- PB-299
- PB-306 [pt]
- PB-312
- PB-313
- PB-317
- PB-321
- PB-323
- PB-325
- PB-327
- PB-331
- PB-335
- PB-337
- PB-338
- PB-342
- PB-348
- PB-354
- PB-356
- PB-359
- PB-364
- PB-366
- PB-368
- PB-370
- PB-372
- PB-374
- PB-376
- PB-378
- PB-380
- PB-382
- PB-383
- PB-384
- PB-386
- PB-387
- PB-388
- PB-390
- PB-391
- PB-392
- PB-393
- PB-394 [pt]
- PB-395 [pt]
- PB-400 [pt]
- PB-404 [pt]
- PB-411 [pt]
- PB-416
- PB-417 [pt]
- PB-418
- PB-420 [pt]
- PB-660

=== Pernambuco ===
- PE-001
- PE-002
- PE-004
- PE-005
- PE-007
- PE-008
- PE-009
- PE-010
- PE-014
- PE-015 [pt]
- PE-016
- PE-017
- PE-018
- PE-020
- PE-022
- PE-024
- PE-025
- PE-027
- PE-028
- PE-031
- PE-032
- PE-034
- PE-035
- PE-036
- PE-037
- PE-038
- PE-041
- PE-042
- PE-045
- PE-048
- PE-049
- PE-050
- PE-051
- PE-052
- PE-053
- PE-054
- PE-056
- PE-058
- PE-059
- PE-060 [pt]
- PE-061 [pt]
- PE-062
- PE-063
- PE-064
- PE-071 [pt]
- PE-072
- PE-073
- PE-074
- PE-075
- PE-076
- PE-077
- PE-078
- PE-080
- PE-081
- PE-082
- PE-083
- PE-084
- PE-085
- PE-086
- PE-087
- PE-088
- PE-089
- PE-090
- PE-091
- PE-094
- PE-095
- PE-096
- PE-097
- PE-099
- PE-100
- PE-102
- PE-103
- PE-105
- PE-106
- PE-107
- PE-108
- PE-109 [pt]
- PE-112
- PE-120
- PE-121
- PE-123
- PE-124
- PE-125
- PE-126
- PE-130
- PE-132
- PE-143
- PE-144
- PE-145
- PE-149
- PE-156
- PE-158
- PE-159
- PE-160
- PE-166 [pt]
- PE-170
- PE-173
- PE-177
- PE-180
- PE-182
- PE-184
- PE-187
- PE-193
- PE-197
- PE-200
- PE-203
- PE-211
- PE-214
- PE-215
- PE-216
- PE-217
- PE-218
- PE-219
- PE-220
- PE-223
- PE-233
- PE-237
- PE-244
- PE-245
- PE-246
- PE-247
- PE-250
- PE-260
- PE-262
- PE-263
- PE-265
- PE-270
- PE-275
- PE-280
- PE-282
- PE-284
- PE-285
- PE-287
- PE-290
- PE-292
- PE-295
- PE-300
- PE-302
- PE-304
- PE-309
- PE-310
- PE-312
- PE-319
- PE-320
- PE-327
- PE-329
- PE-334
- PE-336
- PE-337
- PE-340
- PE-348
- PE-350
- PE-355
- PE-357
- PE-360
- PE-365
- PE-375
- PE-390
- PE-412
- PE-414
- PE-418
- PE-422
- PE-423
- PE-425
- PE-430
- PE-435
- PE-450
- PE-460
- PE-475
- PE-483
- PE-499
- PE-507
- PE-510
- PE-515
- PE-520
- PE-540
- PE-545
- PE-550
- PE-555
- PE-560
- PE-570
- PE-574
- PE-576
- PE-579
- PE-585
- PE-590
- PE-604
- PE-613
- PE-614
- PE-615
- PE-625
- PE-626
- PE-627
- PE-628
- PE-629
- PE-630
- PE-633
- PE-634
- PE-635
- PE-636
- PE-638
- PE-640
- PE-643
- PE-647
- PE-654
- PE-655
- PE-690
- PE-700
- PE-725

Access Highways

- APE-009
- APE-015
- APE-033
- APE-034
- APE-060
- APE-061
- APE-062
- APE-064
- APE-095
- APE-104
- APE-145

Vicinal Highways

- VPE-076
- VPE-097
- VPE-106
- VPE-115
- VPE-134
- VPE-179
- VPE-603
- VPE-614
- VPE-700

=== Paraná ===
==== Permanent highways ====
- PR-082
- PR-090 [pt]
- PR-092 [pt]
- PR-151 [pt]
- PR-160
- PR-170
- PR-180
- PR-182
- PR-218
- PR-239 [pt]
- PR-272 [pt]
- PR-281 [pt]
- PR-317 [pt]
- PR-323
- PR-340 [pt]
- PR-356
- PR-364 [pt]
- PR-369
- PR-400
- PR-404
- PR-405 [pt]
- PR-407 [pt]
- PR-408 [pt]
- PR-410 (Estrada da Graciosa) [pt]
- PR-411 [pt]
- PR-412 [pt]
- PR-415
- PR-417
- PR-418
- PR-419 [pt]
- PR-420 [pt]
- PR-421
- PR-422
- PR-423 [pt]
- PR-424
- PR-427 [pt]
- PR-428 [pt]
- PR-431
- PR-433 [pt]
- PR-435
- PR-436 [pt]
- PR-437
- PR-438 [pt]
- PR-439 [pt]
- PR-441
- PR-442
- PR-443
- PR-444
- PR-445
- PR-446
- PR-447
- PR-448
- PR-449
- PR-450
- PR-451
- PR-452
- PR-453
- PR-454
- PR-455
- PR-456
- PR-457
- PR-458
- PR-459 [pt]
- PR-460
- PR-461
- PR-462
- PR-463
- PR-464
- PR-465
- PR-466
- PR-468
- PR-470
- PR-471
- PR-472
- PR-473
- PR-474
- PR-475
- PR-477
- PR-478
- PR-479
- PR-481
- PR-482
- PR-483
- PR-484
- PR-485
- PR-486 [pt]
- PR-488
- PR-489
- PR-490 [pt]
- PR-491 [pt]
- PR-492
- PR-493
- PR-494
- PR-495 [pt]
- PR-496
- PR-497
- PR-498
- PR-506
- PR-508 [pt]
- PR-509
- PR-510 [pt]
- PR-511 [pt]
- PR-512
- PR-513
- PR-515
- PR-517
- PR-518
- PR-519
- PR-522 [pt]
- PR-525
- PR-526
- PR-531
- PR-532 [pt]
- PR-534 [pt]
- PR-535 [pt]
- PR-536 [pt]
- PR-537 [pt]
- PR-538 [pt]
- PR-539 [pt]
- PR-540 [pt]
- PR-541 [pt]
- PR-542 [pt]
- PR-543 [pt]
- PR-544 [pt]
- PR-545 [pt]
- PR-546 [pt]
- PR-547 [pt]
- PR-548 [pt]
- PR-549 [pt]
- PR-550 [pt]
- PR-551 [pt]
- PR-552 [pt]
- PR-553 [pt]
- PR-554 [pt]
- PR-555 [pt]
- PR-556 [pt]
- PR-557 [pt]
- PR-558 [pt]
- PR-559 [pt]
- PR-560 [pt]
- PR-561 [pt]
- PR-562 [pt]
- PR-563 [pt]
- PR-565 [pt]
- PR-566 [pt]
- PR-567 [pt]
- PR-569 [pt]
- PR-570 [pt]
- PR-573 [pt]
- PR-574 [pt]
- PR-575 [pt]
- PR-576 [pt]
- PR-577 [pt]
- PR-580 [pt]
- PR-581 [pt]
- PR-582 [pt]
- PR-583 [pt]
- PR-585 [pt]
- PR-586 [pt]
- PR-587 [pt]
- PR-589 [pt]
- PR-590 [pt]
- PR-592 [pt]
- PR-650 [pt]
- PR-662 [pt]
- PR-670 [pt]
- PR-680 [pt]
- PR-681 [pt]
- PR-682 [pt]
- PR-683 [pt]
- PR-685 [pt]
- PR-690 [pt]

==== Coincident highways ====
- PRC-158
- PRC-272
- PRC-280
- PRC-340
- PRC-343
- PRC-369
- PRC-373
- PRC-377
- PRC-466
- PRC-467
- PRC-487

==== Access highways ====
- PR-800 [pt]
- PR-802 [pt]
- PR-804 [pt]
- PR-806 [pt]
- PR-807 [pt]
- PR-808 [pt]
- PR-810 [pt]
- PR-813 [pt]
- PR-815 [pt]
- PR-816 [pt]
- PR-820 [pt]
- PR-825 [pt]
- PR-831 [pt]
- PR-835 [pt]
- PR-836 [pt]
- PR-838 [pt]
- PR-845 [pt]
- PR-846 [pt]
- PR-848 [pt]
- PR-850 [pt]
- PR-852 [pt]
- PR-855 [pt]
- PR-862 [pt]
- PR-873 [pt]
- PR-874 [pt]
- PR-875 [pt]
- PR-876 [pt]
- PR-878 [pt]
- PR-879 [pt]
- PR-880 [pt]
- PR-881 [pt]
- PR-883 [pt]
- PR-884 [pt]
- PR-885 [pt]
- PR-886 [pt]
- PR-889 [pt]
- PR-892 [pt]
- PR-897 [pt]
- PR-910 [pt]
- PR-912 [pt]
- PR-918 [pt]
- PR-920 [pt]
- PR-925 [pt]
- PR-930 [pt]
- PR-933 [pt]
- PR-935 [pt]
- PR-937 [pt]
- PR-940 [pt]
- PR-951 [pt]
- PR-960 [pt]
- PR-961 [pt]
- PR-962 [pt]
- PR-963 [pt]
- PR-967 [pt]
- PR-969 [pt]
- PR-970 [pt]
- PR-975 [pt]
- PR-977 [pt]
- PR-978 [pt]
- PR-980 [pt]
- PR-986 [pt]
- PR-990 [pt]

==== Temporary highways ====
- PRT-158 [pt]
- PRT-163 [pt]
- PRT-280 [pt]
- PRT-369 [pt]
- PRT-373 [pt]
- PRT-466 [pt]
- PRT-487 [pt]

=== Piauí ===
- PI-110
- PI-111
- PI-112
- PI-113
- PI-114
- PI-115
- PI-116
- PI-117
- PI-118
- PI-120
- PI-130
- PI-140
- PI-141
- PI-142
- PI-143
- PI-144
- PI-147
- PI-210
- PI-211
- PI-212
- PI-213
- PI-214
- PI-215 [pt]
- PI-216
- PI-217
- PI-218
- PI-219
- PI-221
- PI-223
- PI-224
- PI-225
- PI-226
- PI-227
- PI-228
- PI-229
- PI-232
- PI-233
- PI-234
- PI-236
- PI-237
- PI-238
- PI-239
- PI-240
- PI-241
- PI-242
- PI-243
- PI-244
- PI-245
- PI-246
- PI-247
- PI-248
- PI-249
- PI-250
- PI-252
- PI-253
- PI-254
- PI-255
- PI-256
- PI-257
- PI-258
- PI-259
- PI-260
- PI-261
- PI-262
- PI-263
- PI-270
- PI-271
- PI-274
- PI-277
- PI-301
- PI-302
- PI-303
- PI-304
- PI-305
- PI-306
- PI-307
- PI-308
- PI-309
- PI-310
- PI-311
- PI-312
- PI-313
- PI-314
- PI-315
- PI-320 [pt]
- PI-321
- PI-322
- PI-323
- PI-324
- PI-325
- PI-326
- PI-327
- PI-328
- PI-329
- PI-331
- PI-332
- PI-333
- PI-335
- PI-336
- PI-337
- PI-339
- PI-341
- PI-342
- PI-344
- PI-345
- PI-350
- PI-351
- PI-352
- PI-353
- PI-354
- PI-356
- PI-357
- PI-358
- PI-360
- PI-361
- PI-362
- PI-363
- PI-364
- PI-365
- PI-366
- PI-367
- PI-368
- PI-369
- PI-370
- PI-371
- PI-372
- PI-373
- PI-374
- PI-375
- PI-376
- PI-377
- PI-378
- PI-379
- PI-380
- PI-381
- PI-383
- PI-384
- PI-385
- PI-386
- PI-387
- PI-388
- PI-389
- PI-390
- PI-391
- PI-392
- PI-393
- PI-394
- PI-395
- PI-396
- PI-397
- PI-401
- PI-403
- PI-411
- PI-412
- PI-413
- PI-414
- PI-415
- PI-450
- PI-451
- PI-452
- PI-454
- PI-455
- PI-456
- PI-457
- PI-458
- PI-459
- PI-460
- PI-461
- PI-462
- PI-463
- PI-464
- PI-465
- PI-466
- PI-467
- PI-468
- PI-469
- PI-470
- PI-471
- PI-472
- PI-473
- PI-475
- PI-476
- PI-477
- PI-478

=== Rio de Janeiro ===
- RJ-014 – Estrada de Ibicuí / Estrada do
- RJ-060
- RJ-071 – Via Expressa João Goulart [pt]
- RJ-079 – Estrada Ayrton Senna da Silva
- RJ-081 – Via Light [pt]
- RJ-083 – Avenida Pastor Martin Luther King Jr.
- RJ-085 – Estrada Rio d'Ouro / Avenida Automóvel Clube [pt]
- RJ-093 – Estrada de Lages [pt]
- RJ-097 – Avenida Getúlio de Moura
- RJ-099 – Rodovia Prefeito Abeilard Goulart de Souza [pt]
- RJ-100 – Rodovia RJ-100 [pt]
- RJ-101 – Avenida Governador Leonel de Moura Brizola
- RJ-102 – Rodovia Niterói-Cabo Frio [pt]
- RJ-103 – Transbaixada [pt]
- RJ-104 – Rodovia Niterói-Manilha [pt]
- RJ-105 – Avenida Abílio Augusto Távora
- RJ-106 – Rodovia Amaral Peixoto [pt]
- RJ-107 – Estrada do Imperador
- RJ-108 – Avenida Ewerthon da Costa Xavier
- RJ-109 – Rodovia Raphael de Almeida Magalhães [pt]
- RJ-110 – Avenida Litorânea [pt]
- RJ-111 – Avenida Henrique Duque Estrada Mayer / Estrada Zumbi dos Palmares
- RJ-112 — Estrada João Café Filho / Rua 84 / Estrada 109 / Rua 4
- RJ-113 – Estrada de Adrianópolis [pt]
- RJ-114 – Estrada de Ubatiba [pt]
- RJ-115 – Avenida Pastor Manuel Avelino de Souza
- RJ-116 – Rodovia Presidente João Goulart
- RJ-117 – Estrada Bernardo Coutinho
- RJ-118 – Estrada Sampaio Corrêa-Jaconé [pt]
- RJ-119 – Estrada de Santo Antônio
- RJ-120 – Estrada Cachoeiras de Macacu-Rio Bonito
- RJ-121
- RJ-122 – Estrada Rio-Friburgo [pt]
- RJ-123 – Estrada do Secretário
- RJ-124 – Via Lagos [pt]
- RJ-125 – Rodovia Ary Schiavo [pt]
- RJ-126 – Estrada Bertholdo-Gaviões
- RJ-127 [pt]
- RJ-128 – Estrada do Palmital
- RJ-129
- RJ-130 – Estrada Teresópolis – Friburgo
- RJ-131
- RJ-132 – Avenida Praia Seca
- RJ-133
- RJ-134
- RJ-135
- RJ-136 – Estrada de Morro Grande
- RJ-137 – Estrada de Ipiabas
- RJ-138 – Estrada São Vicente
- RJ-139 – Antiga Estrada Rio-São Paulo
- RJ-140 – Rodovia Márcio Corrêa
- RJ-141 – Estrada de Dorândia [pt]
- RJ-142 – Rodovia Serramar
- RJ-143
- RJ-144
- RJ-145 – Rodovia Alberto Santos Dumont [pt]
- RJ-146
- RJ-147 – Estrada Valença / Parapeúna
- RJ-148 [pt]
- RJ-149 – Estrada São João Marcos [pt]
- RJ-150
- RJ-151
- RJ-152
- RJ-153 – Rodovia Júlio Caruso/Rodovia Gecy Vieira Gonçalves
- RJ-154 – Estrada Manoel Fernandes Pereira
- RJ-155 – Rodovia Saturnino Braga
- RJ-156
- RJ-157 – Rodovia Engenheiro Alexandre Drable
- RJ-158 [pt]
- RJ-159
- RJ-160 [pt]
- RJ-161 – Rodovia Joaquim Mariano de Souza
- RJ-162 – Rodovia Serramar [pt]
- RJ-163 – Rodovia Dr. Rubens Tramujas Mader [pt]
- RJ-164
- RJ-165 [pt]
- RJ-166
- RJ-168 [pt]
- RJ-170
- RJ-172
- RJ-174
- RJ-176
- RJ-178 [pt]
- RJ-180
- RJ-182
- RJ-184
- RJ-186
- RJ-188
- RJ-190 [pt]
- RJ-192 [pt]
- RJ-194
- RJ-196
- RJ-198
- RJ-200
- RJ-202
- RJ-204
- RJ-206
- RJ-208
- RJ-210
- RJ-212
- RJ-214 – Rodovia Dr. Mauro Alves Ribeiro Jr.
- RJ-216
- RJ-218
- RJ-220 – Rodovia Deputado Luiz Fernando Linhares
- RJ-222
- RJ-224
- RJ-226
- RJ-228
- RJ-230 – Rodovia Prefeito Alaor Braz da Fonseca [pt]
- RJ-232
- RJ-234
- RJ-236 – Rodovia Sérgio Viana Barroso
- RJ-238 [pt]
- RJ-240
- RJ-242
- RJ-244

=== Rio Grande do Norte ===
- RN-002
- RN-003
- RN-011
- RN-013
- RN-015
- RN-016
- RN-021
- RN-022
- RN-023
- RN-025
- RN-031
- RN-032
- RN-041
- RN-042
- RN-051
- RN-062
- RN-063 [pt]
- RN-064
- RN-073
- RN-074
- RN-075
- RN-076
- RN-077
- RN-078
- RN-079
- RN-081
- RN-083
- RN-085
- RN-086
- RN-087
- RN-088
- RN-089
- RN-091
- RN-092
- RN-093
- RN-117
- RN-118
- RN-120
- RN-129
- RN-160 [pt]
- RN-177
- RN-203
- RN-221
- RN-226
- RN-233
- RN-263
- RN-269
- RN-288
- RN-301 (Via Costeira)
- RN-302
- RN-303
- RN-304
- RN-305
- RN-306
- RN-307
- RN-308
- RN-309
- RN-310
- RN-311
- RN-312
- RN-313
- RN-314
- RN-315
- RN-316
- RN-317
- RN-332
- RN-401
- RN-402
- RN-403
- RN-404
- RN-405
- RN-406
- RN-407
- RN-408
- RN-501

=== Rondônia ===
- RO-002
- RO-003
- RO-005
- RO-006
- RO-010
- RO-101
- RO-133
- RO-135 [pt]
- RO-140
- RO-144
- RO-205
- RO-257
- RO-267
- RO-313
- RO-370
- RO-377
- RO-383
- RO-387 [pt]
- RO-391
- RO-399
- RO-400
- RO-401
- RO-402
- RO-404
- RO-405
- RO-406
- RO-407
- RO-408
- RO-410
- RO-420
- RO-421
- RO-422
- RO-425
- RO-427
- RO-429
- RO-431
- RO-432
- RO-434
- RO-441
- RO-443
- RO-444
- RO-445
- RO-447
- RO-448
- RO-450
- RO-452
- RO-455
- RO-456
- RO-457
- RO-458
- RO-459
- RO-460
- RO-461
- RO-463
- RO-464
- RO-466
- RO-467
- RO-470
- RO-471
- RO-472
- RO-473
- RO-474
- RO-475
- RO-476
- RO-477
- RO-478
- RO-479
- RO-480
- RO-481
- RO-482
- RO-484
- RO-485
- RO-486
- RO-487
- RO-488
- RO-489
- RO-490
- RO-491
- RO-492
- RO-493 (Production Street)
- RO-494
- RO-495
- RO-496
- RO-497
- RO-498
- RO-499

=== Roraima ===
- RR-171 (Uiramutã Access) [pt]
- RR-172 [pt]
- RR-175 [pt]
- RR-201
- RR-202
- RR-203 (Estrada do Tepequém) [pt]
- RR-204 [pt]
- RR-205 (Estrada Do Rio Alegre) [pt]
- RR-206 [pt]
- RR-207 [pt]
- RR-311 [pt]
- RR-319 (Transarrozeira) [pt]
- RR-321 [pt]
- RR-325 (Vicinal Tronco Apiaú) [pt]
- RR-340
- RR-342 [pt]
- RR-343 [pt]
- RR-344 [pt]
- RR-345 [pt]
- RR-347 [pt]
- RR-348 [pt]
- RR-353
- RR-359
- RR-365
- RR-367
- RR-369
- RR-371
- RR-400 [pt]
- RR-402 [pt]
- RR-403 [pt]
- RR-405 [pt]
- RR-407 [pt]
- RR-444 [pt]
- RR-452 [pt]
- RR-460 (Transbananeira) [pt]
- RR-461

=== Santa Catarina ===
- SC-100
- SC-102
- SC-108 [pt]
- SC-110
- SC-112
- SC-114
- SC-120
- SC-135
- SC-150
- SC-154
- SC-155
- SC-156
- SC-157
- SC-159
- SC-160
- SC-161
- SC-163
- SC-281 [pt]
- SC-283 [pt]
- SC-284
- SC-285
- SC-290
- SC-301
- SC-302
- SC-303
- SC-304
- SC-305
- SC-340
- SC-350
- SC-355
- SC-361
- SC-370 [pt]
- SC-386
- SC-390 [pt]
- SC-400
- SC-401 [pt]
- SC-402
- SC-403
- SC-404
- SC-405
- SC-406
- SC-407
- SC-408
- SC-409
- SC-410
- SC-411 [pt]
- SC-412 [pt]
- SC-413
- SC-414
- SC-415
- SC-416 [pt]
- SC-417
- SC-418
- SC-420
- SC-421 [pt]
- SC-422
- SC-423
- SC-425
- SC-426
- SC-427
- SC-428
- SC-429
- SC-430
- SC-431
- SC-434
- SC-435 [pt]
- SC-436
- SC-437
- SC-438
- SC-439
- SC-440
- SC-441
- SC-442
- SC-443
- SC-444
- SC-445 [pt]
- SC-446
- SC-447
- SC-448
- SC-449
- SC-450
- SC-451
- SC-452
- SC-453
- SC-454
- SC-455
- SC-456
- SC-457
- SC-458
- SC-459
- SC-460
- SC-461
- SC-462
- SC-463
- SC-464
- SC-465
- SC-466
- SC-467
- SC-468
- SC-469
- SC-470
- SC-473
- SC-474 [pt]
- SC-477
- SC-478
- SC-479
- SC-480
- SC-482
- SC-484
- SC-486
- SC-489
- SC-492
- SC-496
- SC-497

Jaguarana

- JAU-404
- JAU-454
- JAU-478
- JAU-486
- JAU-487
- JAU-508

Chapecó

- EMC-010
- EMC-020
- EMC-030
- EMC-040
- EMC-050
- EMC-104
- EMC-105
- EMC-107
- EMC-109
- EMC-111
- EMC-116
- EMC-117
- EMC-118
- EMC-119
- EMC-120
- EMC-121
- EMC-122
- EMC-126
- EMC-128
- EMC-129
- EMC-130
- EMC-131
- EMC-132
- EMC-133
- EMC-136
- EMC-154
- EMC-156
- EMC-157
- EMC-158
- EMC-159
- EMC-160
- EMC-161
- EMC-162
- EMC-168
- EMC-169
- EMC-172
- EMC-176
- EMC-191
- EMC-209
- EMC-219
- EMC-220
- EMC-221
- EMC-222
- EMC-224
- EMC-225
- EMC-226
- EMC-236
- ENC-240
- EMC-243
- EMC-249
- EMC-251
- EMC-252
- EMC-259
- EMC-261
- EMC-262
- EMC-263
- EMC-265
- EMC-271
- EMC-275
- EMC-276
- EMC-277
- EMC-280
- EMC-282
- EMC-290
- EMC-294
- EMC-296
- EMC-297
- EMC-298
- EMC-303
- EMC-305
- EMC-307
- EMC-308
- EMC-309
- EMC-311
- EMC-312
- EMC-314
- EMC-328
- EMC-330
- EMC-331
- EMC-334
- EMC-342
- EMC-351
- EMC-354
- EMC-356
- EMC-357
- EMC-358
- EMC-359
- EMC-360
- EMC-364
- EMC-366
- EMC-374
- EMC-378
- EMC-380
- EMC-382
- EMC-384
- EMC-386
- EMC-388
- EMC-390
- EMC-394
- EMC-430
- EMC-444
- EMC-450
- EMC-472
- EMC-473
- EMC-475
- EMC-497
- EMC-498
- EMC-500
- EMC-532
- EMC-577
- EMC-579
- EMC-584
- EMC-587
- EMC-648
- EMC-650

Jaraguá Do Sul

- JGS-010
- JGS-240
- JGS-331
- JGS-425
- JGS-430
- JGS-437
- JGS-448
- JGS-452
- JGS-462
- JGS-463
- JGS-466
- JGS-470
- JGS-473
- JGS-476
- JGS-479
- JGS-481
- JGS-485
- JGS-486
- JGS-489
- JGS-490
- JGS-491
- JGS-492
- JGS-493
- JGS-494
- JGS-495
- JGS-496
- JGS-501
- JGS-502
- JGS-503
- JGS-506
- JGS-508
- JGS-510
- JGS-511
- JGS-514
- JGS-515
- JGS-516
- JGS-518
- JGS-519
- JGS-521
- JGS-527
- JGS-528
- JGS-530
- JGS-532
- JGS-535
- JGS-536
- JGS-537
- JGS-541
- JGS-542
- JGS-544
- JGS-545
- JGS-546
- JGS-550
- JGS-555
- JGS-556
- JGS-569
- JGS-578
- JGS-580
- JGS-583
- JGS-585

=== Sergipe ===
- SE-040
- SE-050
- SE-065
- SE-090
- SE-100
- SE-102
- SE-104
- SE-120
- SE-135
- SE-160
- SE-170
- SE-175
- SE-177
- SE-179
- SE-200 [pt]
- SE-204
- SE-210
- SE-216
- SE-218
- SE-220
- SE-222
- SE-224
- SE-226
- SE-228
- SE-230
- SE-235
- SE-240
- SE-245
- SE-255
- SE-265
- SE-270 [pt]
- SE-280
- SE-282
- SE-285
- SE-287
- SE-290
- SE-295
- SE-303
- SE-308
- SE-309
- SE-310
- SE-315
- SE-317
- SE-321
- SE-325
- SE-331
- SE-335
- SE-339
- SE-343
- SE-355
- SE-360
- SE-361
- SE-368
- SE-383
- SE-399
- SE-403
- SE-405
- SE-407
- SE-409
- SE-412
- SE-413
- SE-414
- SE-415
- SE-417
- SE-419
- SE-425
- SE-427
- SE-429
- SE-430
- SE-431
- SE-433
- SE-434
- SE-435
- SE-436
- SE-437
- SE-438
- SE-439
- SE-440
- SE-448
- SE-453
- SE-457
- SE-459
- SE-460
- SE-462
- SE-464
- SE-466
- SE-467
- SE-468
- SE-469
- SE-470
- SE-472
- SE-473
- SE-475
- SE-476
- SE-477
- SE-488
- SE-490
- SE-492

=== Tocantins ===
- TO-010
- TO-020
- TO-030
- TO-040
- TO-050 [pt]
- TO-070
- TO-080
- TO-110
- TO-130
- TO-164
- TO-181
- TO-201
- TO-222
- TO-226
- TO-230
- TO-239
- TO-245
- TO-247
- TO-255
- TO-280
- TO-296
- TO-335
- TO-342
- TO-348
- TO-354
- TO-365
- TO-373
- TO-374
- TO-387
- TO-403
- TO-404
- TO-405
- TO-407
- TO-409
- TO-410
- TO-414
- TO-415
- TO-416
- TO-418
- TO-420
- TO-421
- TO-424
- TO-425
- TO-426
- TO-427
- TO-429
- TO-430
- TO-431
- TO-432
- TO-433
- TO-434
- TO-436
- TO-437
- TO-442
- TO-445
- TO-446
- TO-447
- TO-452
- TO-454
- TO-455
- TO-456
- TO-458
- TO-460
- TO-464
- TO-476
- TO-477
- TO-481
- TO-483
- TO-485
- TO-491
- TO-498
- TO-499
- TO-500
