= BR-453 (Brazil highway) =

Highway in Brazil

BR-453 Route of the Sun
- Rota do Sol
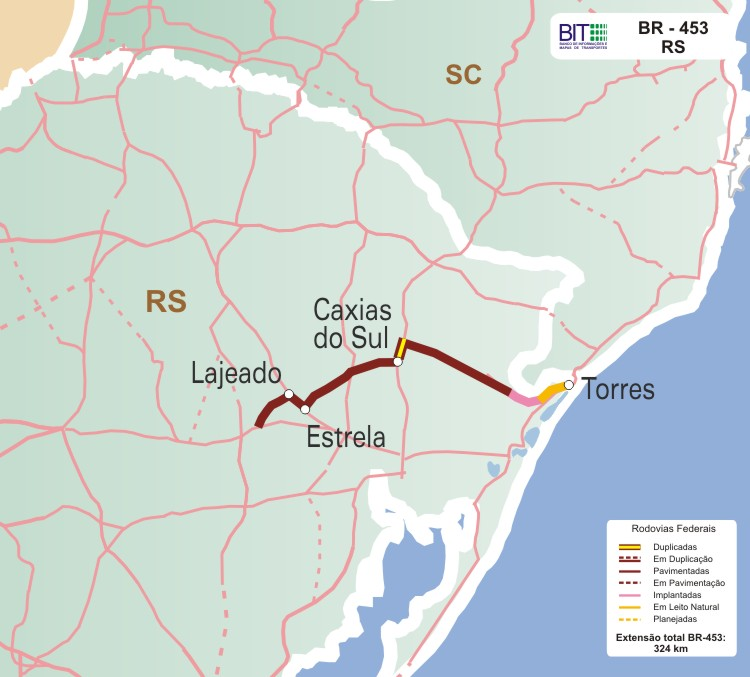

Route information
- Length: 201.76 mi (324.70 km)
- Existed: 1972–present

Major junctions
- West end: Venâncio Aires, Rio Grande do Sul
- BR-386 in Lajeado, RS; RS-128 in Teutônia, RS; RS-446 in Garibaldi, RS; BR-470 in Garibaldi, RS; RS-444 in Bento Gonçalves, RS; RS-448 in Farroupilha, RS; RS-122 in Caxias do Sul e Farroupilha, RS; BR-116 in Caxias do Sul, RS; RS-230 in Caxias do Sul, RS; RS-476 in São Francisco de Paula, RS; RS-110 in São Francisco de Paula, RS; RS-020 in São Francisco de Paula, RS
- East end: Terra de Areia, Rio Grande do Sul

Location
- Country: Brazil
- State: Rio Grande do Sul

Highway system
- Highways in Brazil; Federal; Rio Grande do Sul State Highways

BR-453, also called the Rota do Sol (Route of the Sun) is a federal highway in Brazil with a length of approximately 202 miles (325 km) that links the east coast of Rio Grande do Sul to the Serra Gaúcha (Gaucho mountain range). The highway starts in Venâncio Aires and ends in Terra de Areia, Rio Grande do Sul.

Work on the highway began in 1972 and was completed in 2008. BR-453 functions as a shortcut to the beaches of Rio Grande do Sul, shaving off 100 km (62 mi) from the old route. Before the construction of BR-453, all road traffic going from the Gaucho Range to the coast had to drive through the capital city of Porto Alegre and go along BR-290 (referred to as "Freeway" in Portuguese).

== See also ==
- Rio Grande do Sul
- Serra Gaúcha
- Polícia Rodoviária Federal
