= BR-377 (Brazil highway) =

Highway in Brazil

BR-377
- Osvaldo Aranha Highway
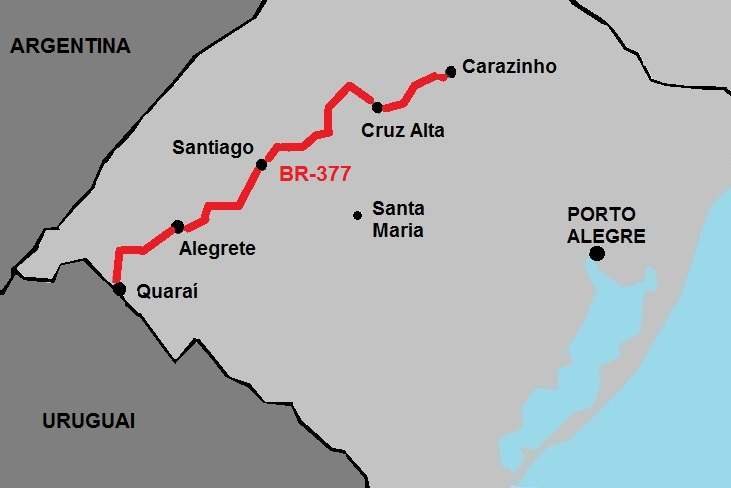

Route information
- Length: 523.0 km (325.0 mi)

Major junctions
- East end: Carazinho, Rio Grande do Sul
- RS-342 e BR-158 in Cruz Alta, RS; BR-285 in Santa Bárbara do Sul, RS; BR-287 in Santiago, RS; RS-241 in São Francisco de Assis, RS; RS-566 in Alegrete, RS
- West end: Quaraí, Rio Grande do Sul

Location
- Country: Brazil
- State: Rio Grande do Sul

Highway system
- Highways in Brazil; Federal; Rio Grande do Sul State Highways

BR-377 is a diagonal federal highway in Rio Grande do Sul, Brazil. It connects the city of Carazinho to the border with Uruguay, in the Brazilian city of Quaraí.

In Alegrete and Quaraí, there is a large production of rice and sheep farming. The production of soy and corn, among other crops, is large throughout the state.
