= BR-287 (Brazil highway) =

Highway in Brazil

BR-287
- Highway of Integration; Rodovia da Integração
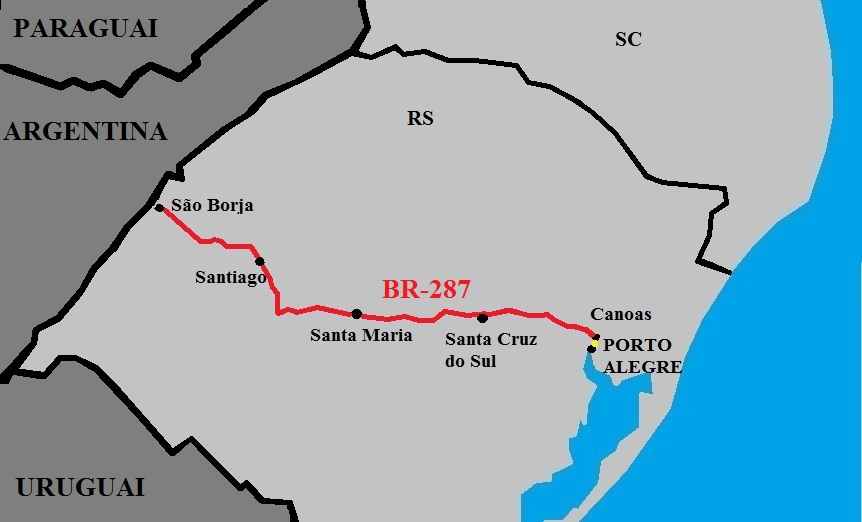

Route information
- Length: 536.9 km (333.6 mi)

Major junctions
- East end: Canoas
- RS-244 in Venâncio Aires; BR-471 in Santa Cruz do Sul; RS-410 in Candelária; BR-481 in Novo Cabrais; BR-158 in Santa Maria; RS-241 in São Vicente do Sul; BR-377 in Santiago
- West end: São Borja

Location
- Country: Brazil
- State: Rio Grande do Sul

Highway system
- Highways in Brazil; Federal; Rio Grande do Sul State Highways

The BR-287 is a 536.9 km-long federal highway across the Brazilian state of Rio Grande do Sul, also known as the Highway of Integration.

It starts in the Region of Porto Alegre, traverses the Center Eastern and Central West, and ends in the Southwest region. It crosses the main tobacco-producing region of the country, in the cities of Santa Cruz do Sul and Venancio Aires, where there are many tobacco manufacturers and distributors, including Universal Leaf Tobacco, Philip Morris, Souza Cruz, Associated Tobacco Company and Alliance One.

== Duplication ==
In 2019, the Federal Government announced that BR-287 was being granted to the private initiative for 30 years, with the concession beginning in 2020. The 204 km section between Tabaí and Santa Maria was to be converted into dual carriageway highway over 5 years in the urban section and 11 years in total, from the beginning of the concession. The forecast is that the stretch between Tabaí and Santa Cruz do Sul will be duplicated first, between 2026 and 2028, and the duplication between Santa Cruz do Sul and Santa Maria should occur between 2028 and 2031. The highway has a movement of more than 11 thousand vehicles per day, and normally a highway must be duplicated from the moment it reaches the movement of 7 thousand vehicles per day.

== Gallery ==
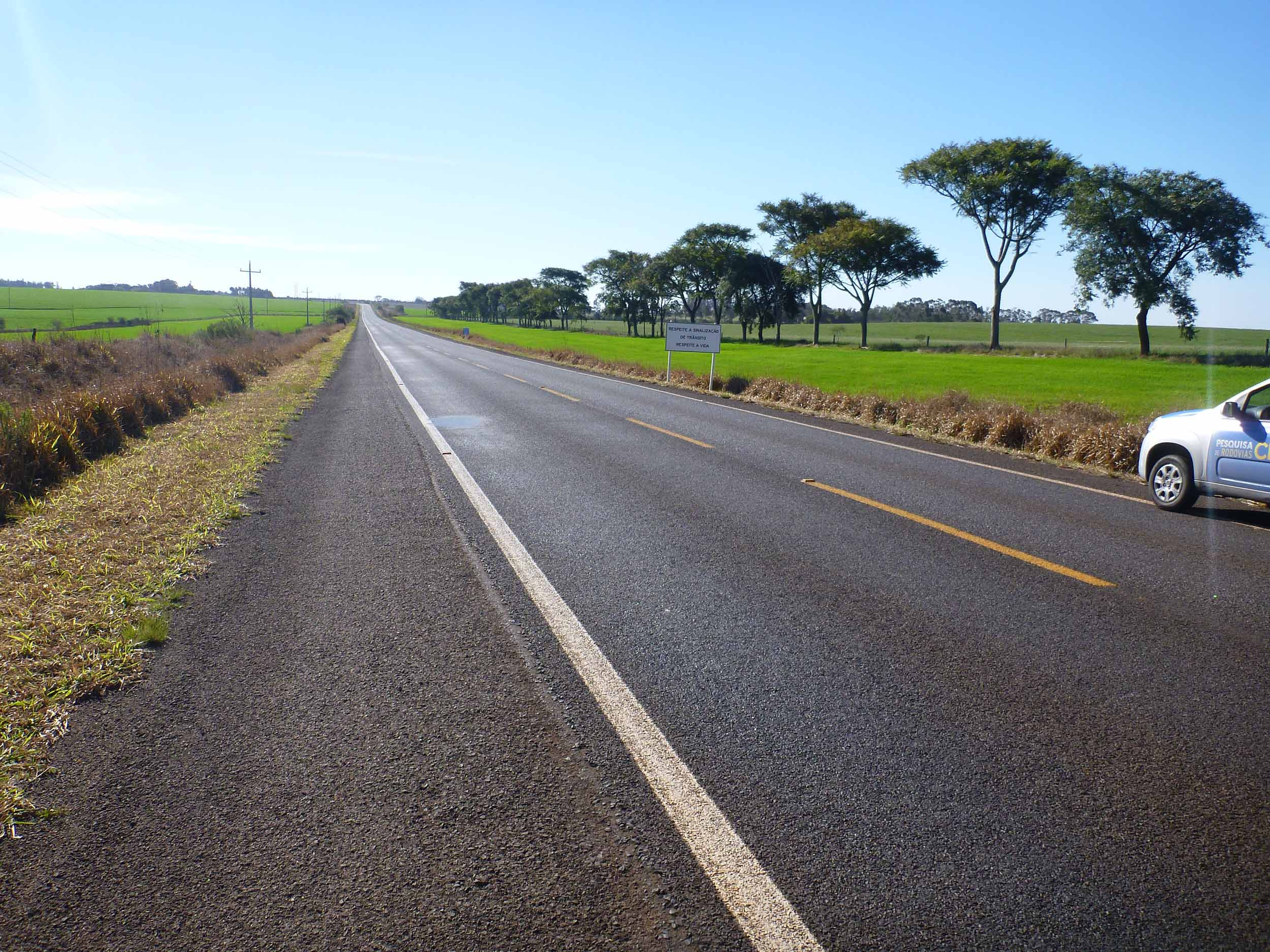
BR-287 in Rio Grande do Sul

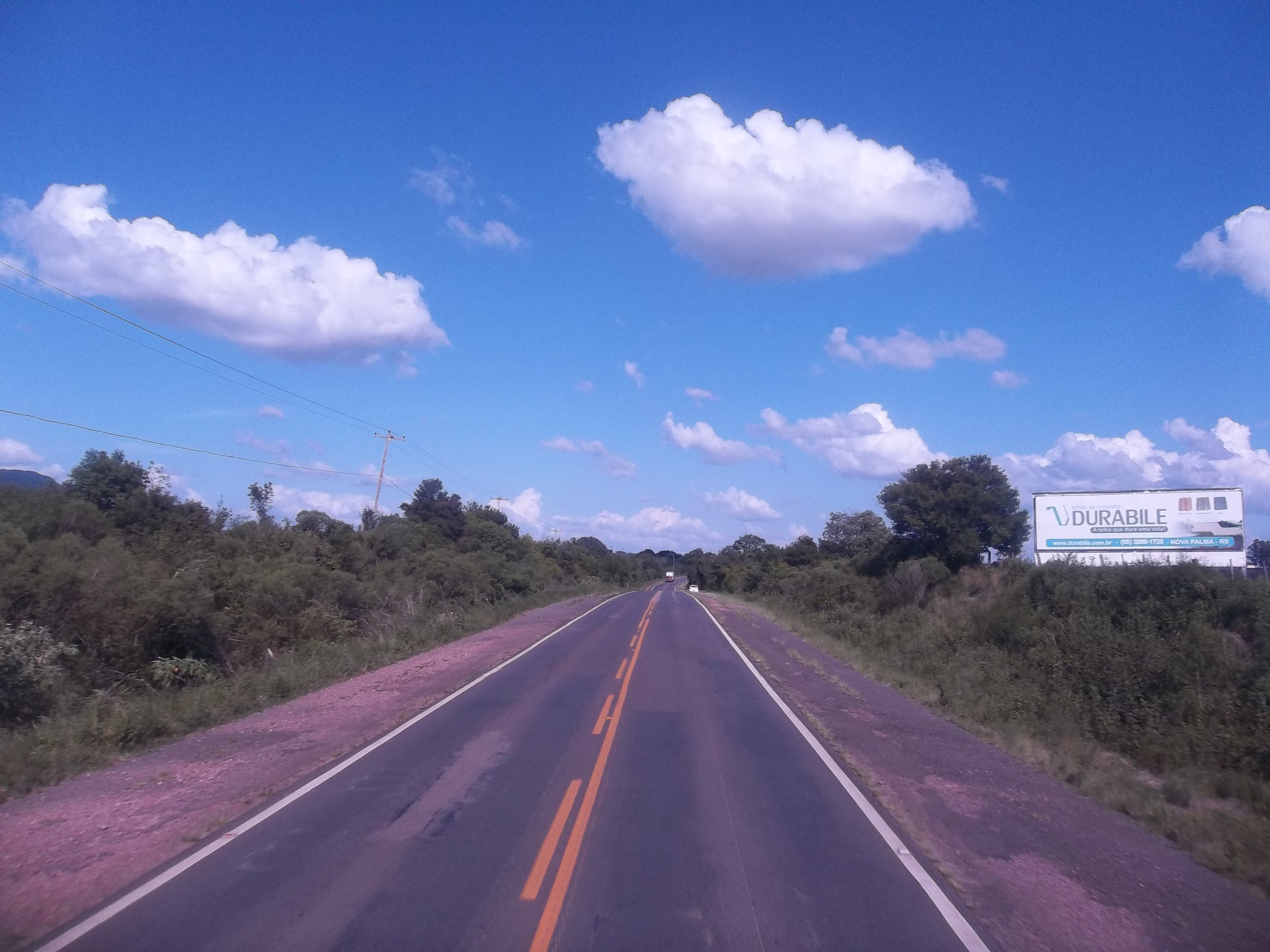
BR-287 in Santa Maria, Rio Grande do Sul

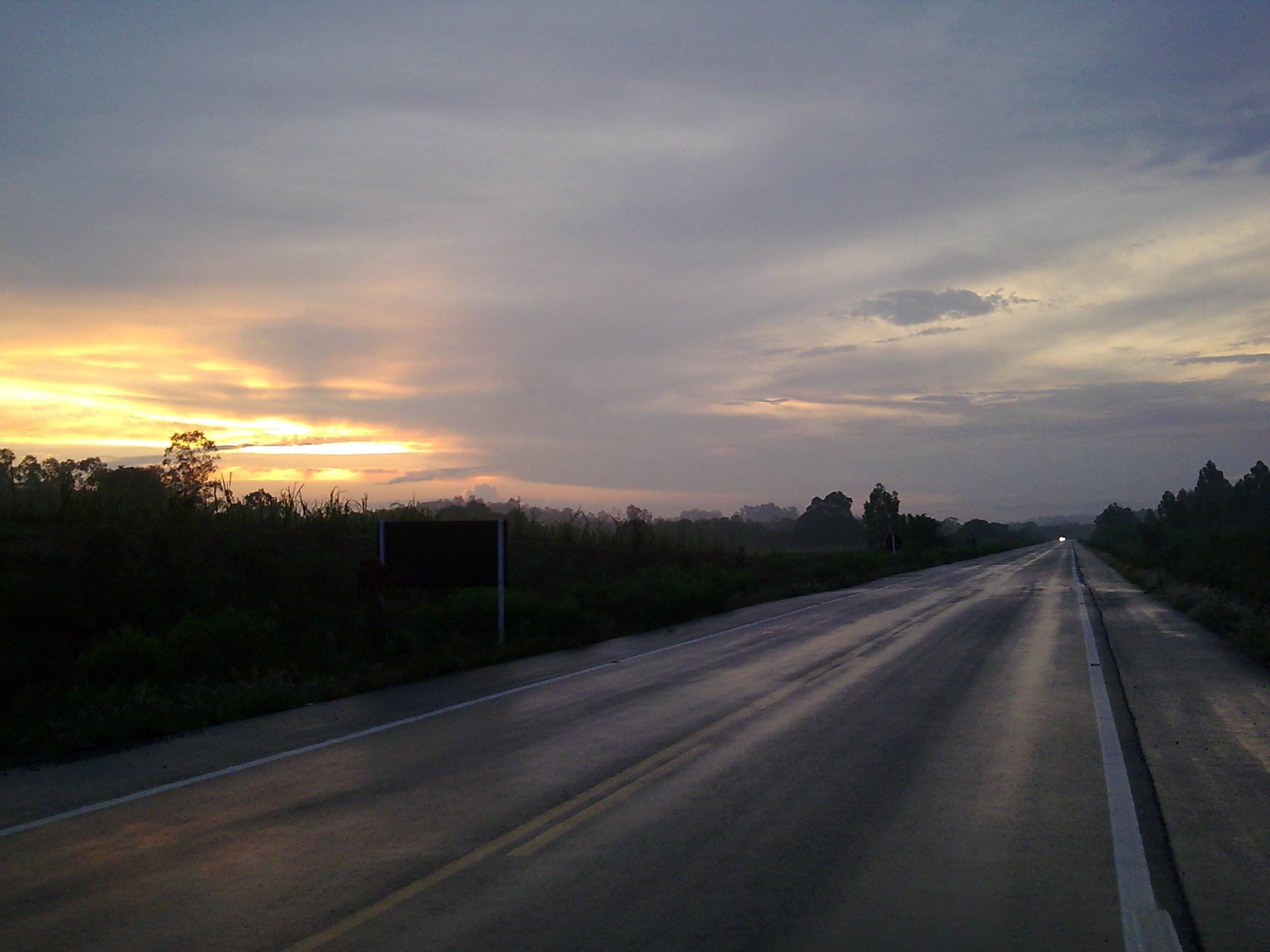
BR-287 in Vera Cruz, Rio Grande do Sul
