= BR-285 (Brazil highway) =

Highway in Brazil

BR-285

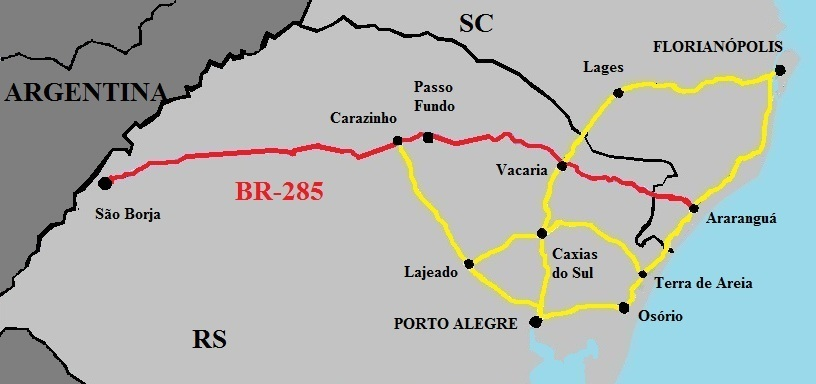

Route information
- Length: 674.5 km (419.1 mi)

Major junctions
- East end: Araranguá, Santa Catarina
- BR-116 in Vacaria; BR-470 in Lagoa Vermelha; BR-153 in Passo Fundo; BR-386 in Carazinho; BR-158 in Panambi; BR-472 e BR-287 in São Borja
- West end: São Borja, Rio Grande do Sul

Location
- Country: Brazil

Highway system
- Highways in Brazil; Federal

BR-285 is an east-west Brazilian federal highway that starts in Araranguá, Santa Catarina, and crosses the Gaucho range and highlands. It stretches approximately 674.5 km, passing through cities such as Vacaria, Lagoa Vermelha, Passo Fundo, Carazinho, Ijuí e São Luiz Gonzaga, and ends in São Borja, Rio Grande do Sul, on the border of Argentina.

During the summer months, BR-285 receives a large flow of vehicles from Argentina, heading for the beaches of Rio Grande do Sul and Santa Catarina. The journey is between São Borja (border with Argentina) and Vacaria. From there, drivers who decide to spend the summer on the riograndense beaches descend to Caxias do Sul to take the Rota do Sol to Terra de Areia. Another alternative is to ascend to Lages, already in the state of Santa Catarina, and from there continue to Florianópolis. The section between Vacaria and Araranguá, in addition to crossing a part of the mountains, has a low road infrastructure. There is an unpaved section between the cities of São José dos Ausentes and Timbé do Sul, so the movement of vehicles is very low. In August 2020, only 8 km remained to complete the paving of BR-285, between the city of São José dos Ausentes and the border with Santa Catarina.

== Gallery ==
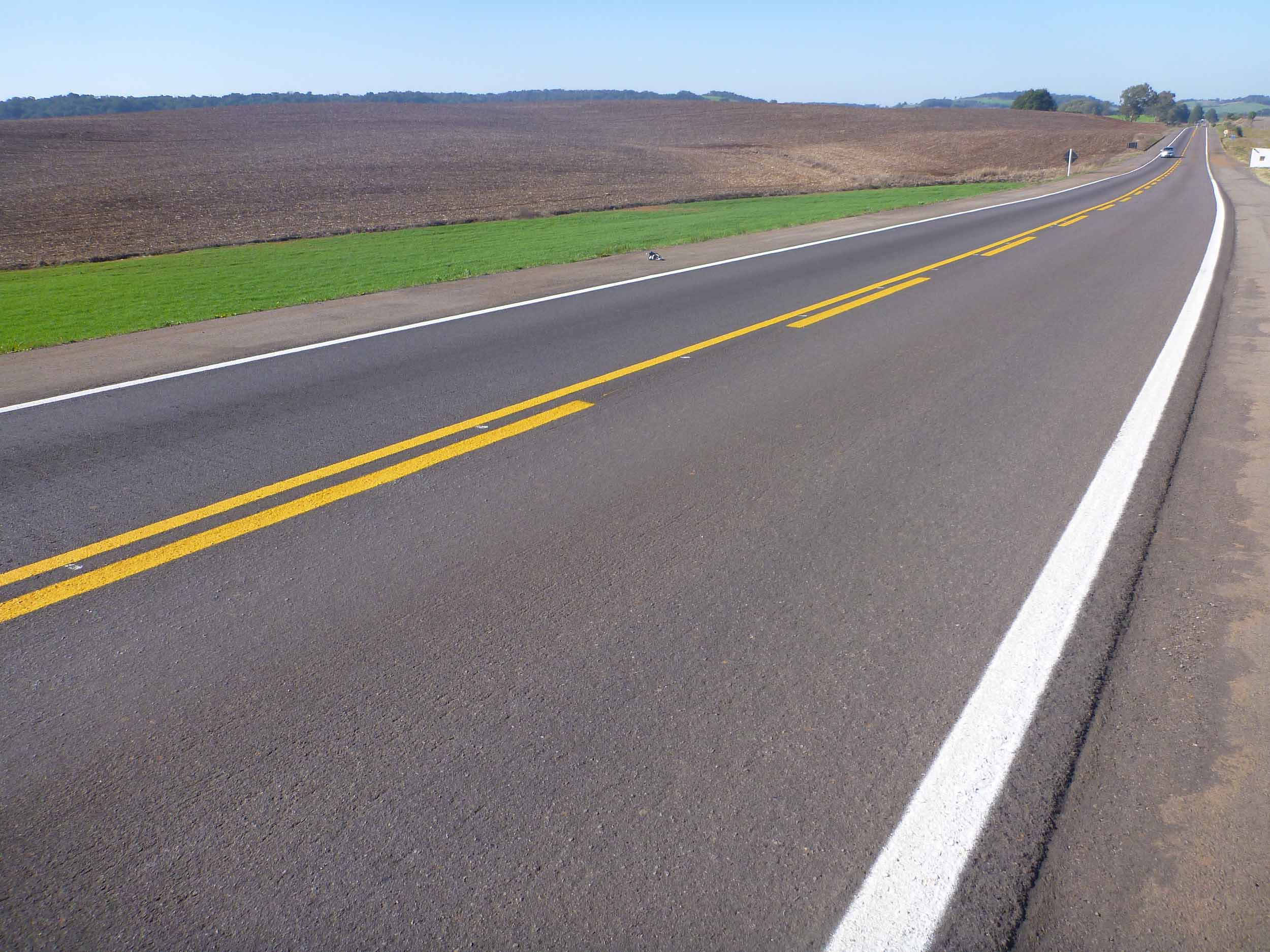
BR-285 in Lagoa Vermelha.

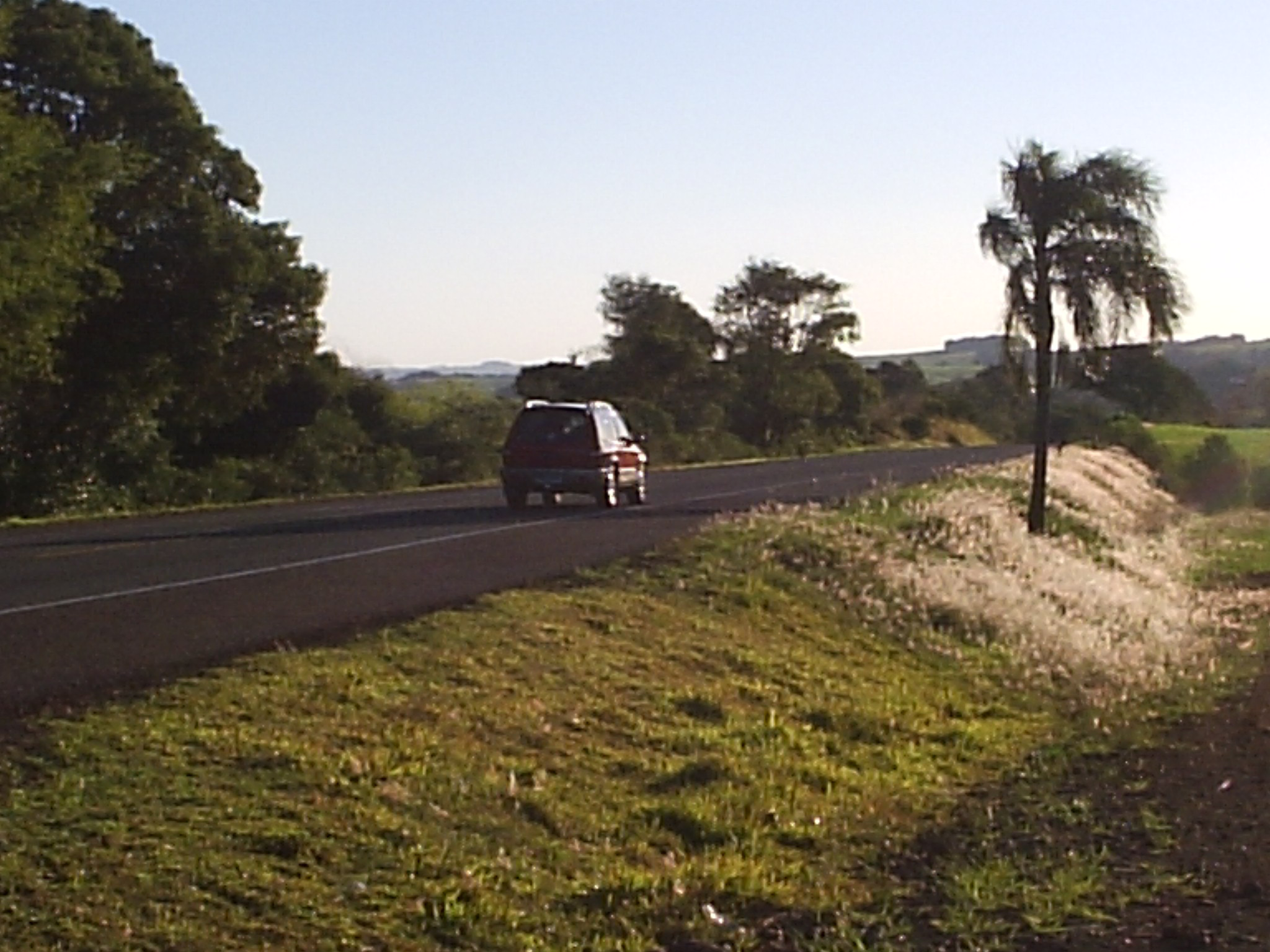
BR-285 in Panambi, in Northwestern Rio Grande do Sul.

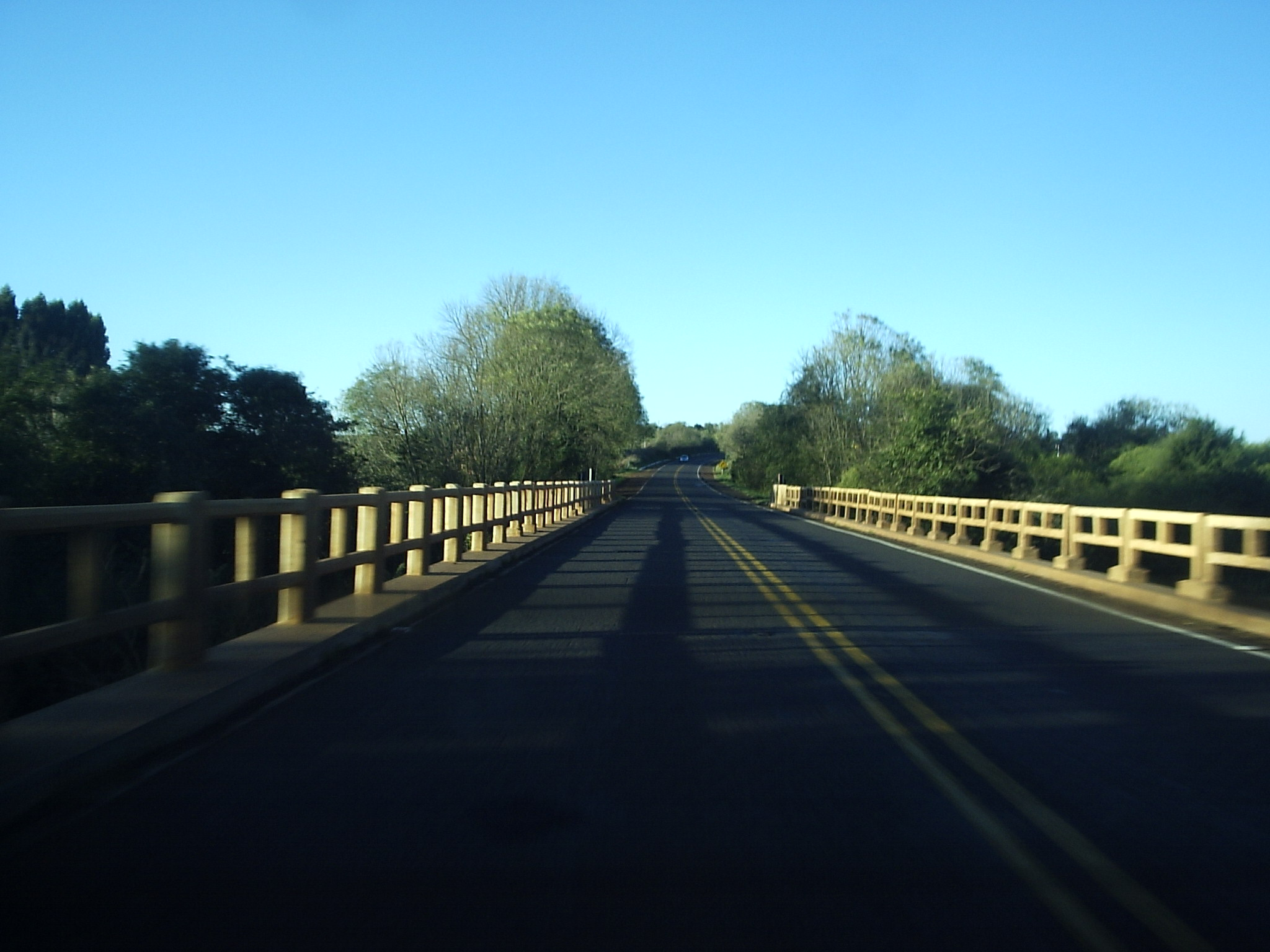
Bridge on the Caxambu River on BR-285 in Panambi.
