= BR-290 (Brazil highway) =

Highway in Brazil

BR-290
- Osvaldo Aranha Highway
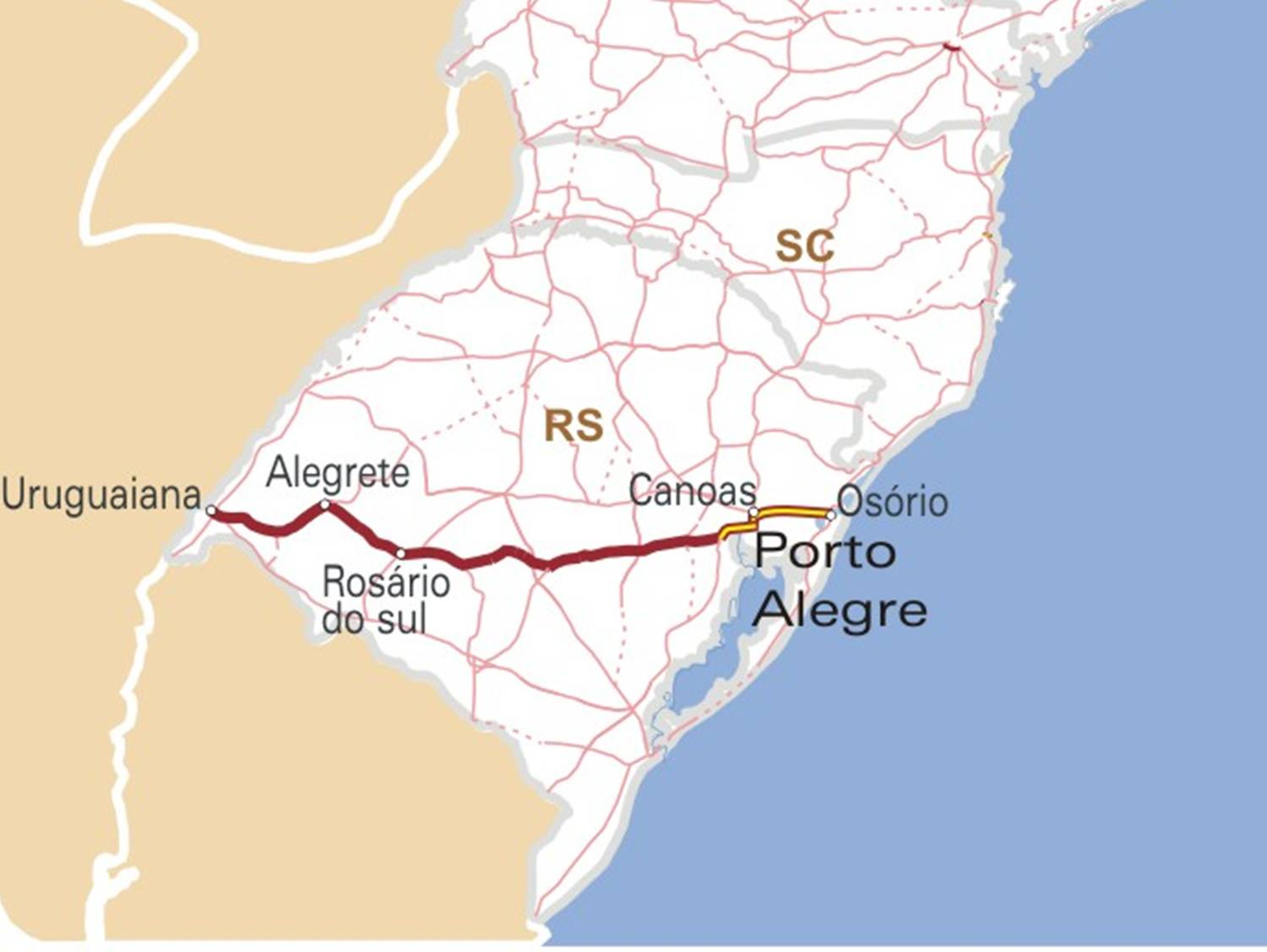

Route information
- Length: 726 km (451 mi)

Major junctions
- East end: Osório, Rio Grande do Sul
- BR-116 in Porto Alegre, RS; BR-153 in Cachoeira do Sul, RS; BR-158 in Rosário do Sul, RS; BR-377 in Alegrete, RS
- West end: Uruguaiana, Rio Grande do Sul

Location
- Country: Brazil
- State: Rio Grande do Sul

Highway system
- Highways in Brazil; Federal; Rio Grande do Sul State Highways

The BR-290 (officially Osvaldo Aranha Highway) is an important highway in the Rio Grande do Sul state of Brazil. Approximately 726km long, the highway runs from the port city of Osório westward to the city of Uruguaiana, on the border of Argentina.

== Duplication ==
The Freeway, a 96.6 km stretch that connects Porto Alegre to Osório, was inaugurated on the morning of September 26, 1973, as an alternative to RS-030 for the coast, now known as Estrada Velha. The nickname was given in reference to California expressways. It was the first Brazilian highway, with a limit of 120 km/h at the time of the opening of its double lanes, separated by a wide central construction site. Subsequently, the Federal Government lowered the Freeway's speed limit to 80 km/h, due to the oil crisis in the 1970s, to save fuel. Today, the limit is 110 km/h. Freeway also received a 3rd track in both directions, after some time. Between 2031 and 2033, Freeway should earn its 4th lane in each direction.

The duplication works of 115.7 kilometers of the highway, between Eldorado do Sul and Pantano Grande, started in 2015. However, in 2019, the percentage of completion of the work was only 15%. Due to the economic crisis that Brazil is going through, DNIT is prioritizing other works, such as the duplication of BR 116 and Ponte do Guaíba. The cost of the work is around R $ 700 million.

== Gallery ==
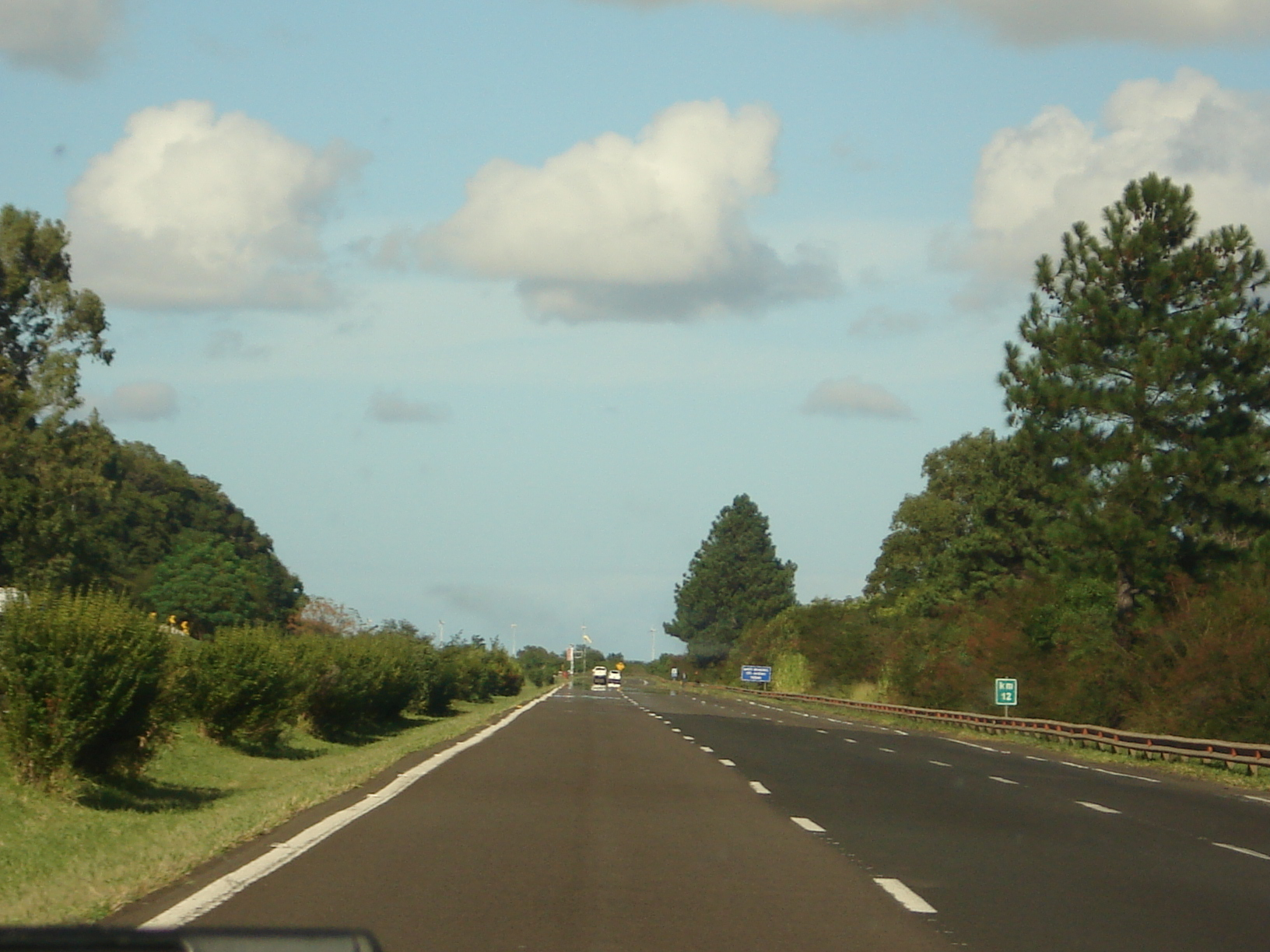
BR-290 in Osório, Rio Grande do Sul

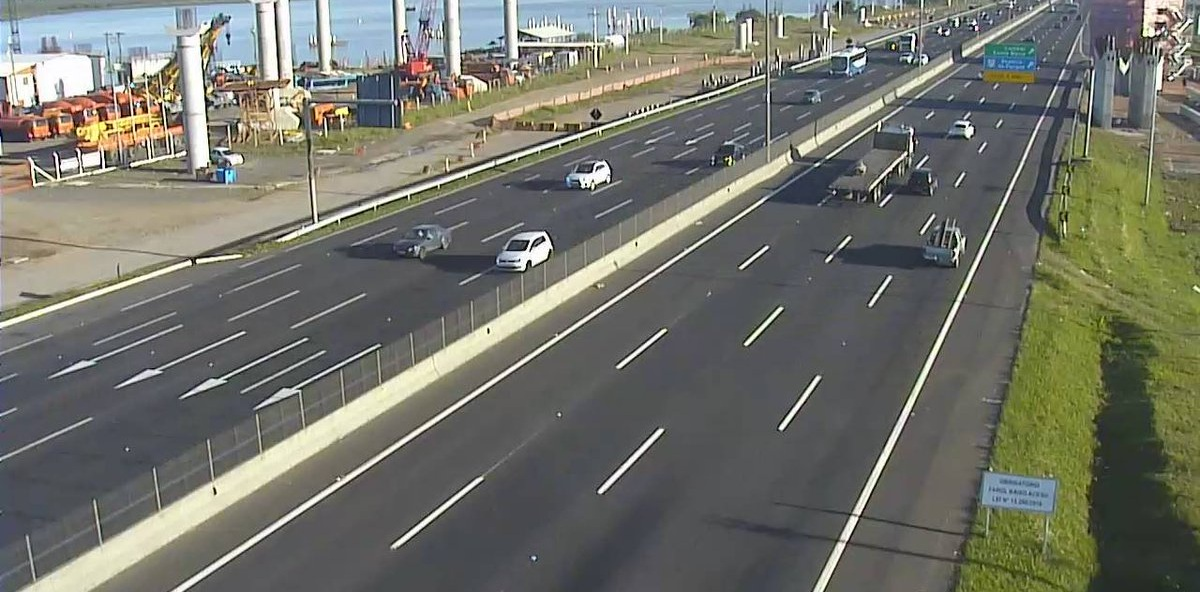
BR-290 near Porto Alegre, Rio Grande do Sul

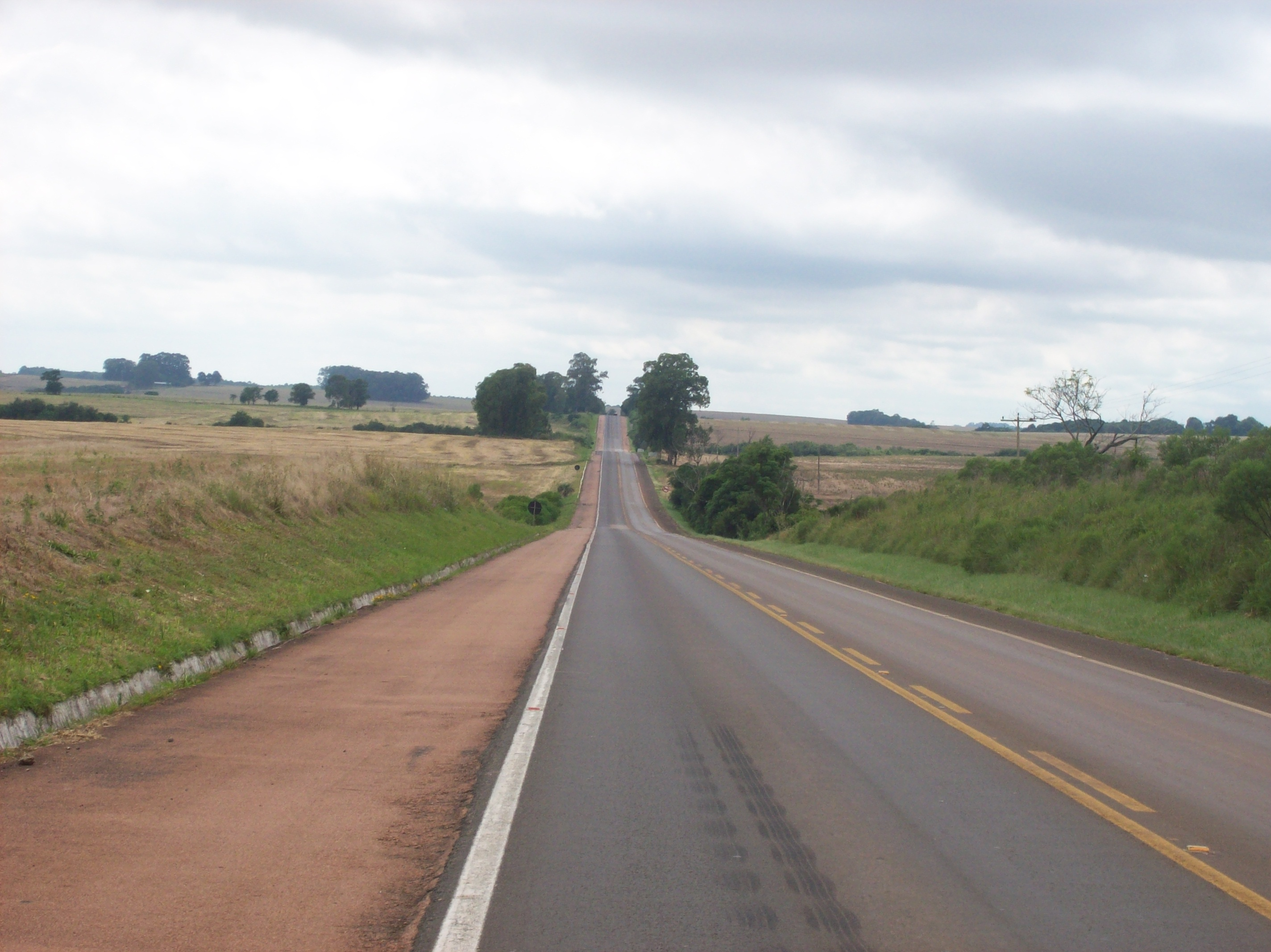
BR-290 in Cachoeira do Sul, Rio Grande do Sul
