= WR-40 Langusta =

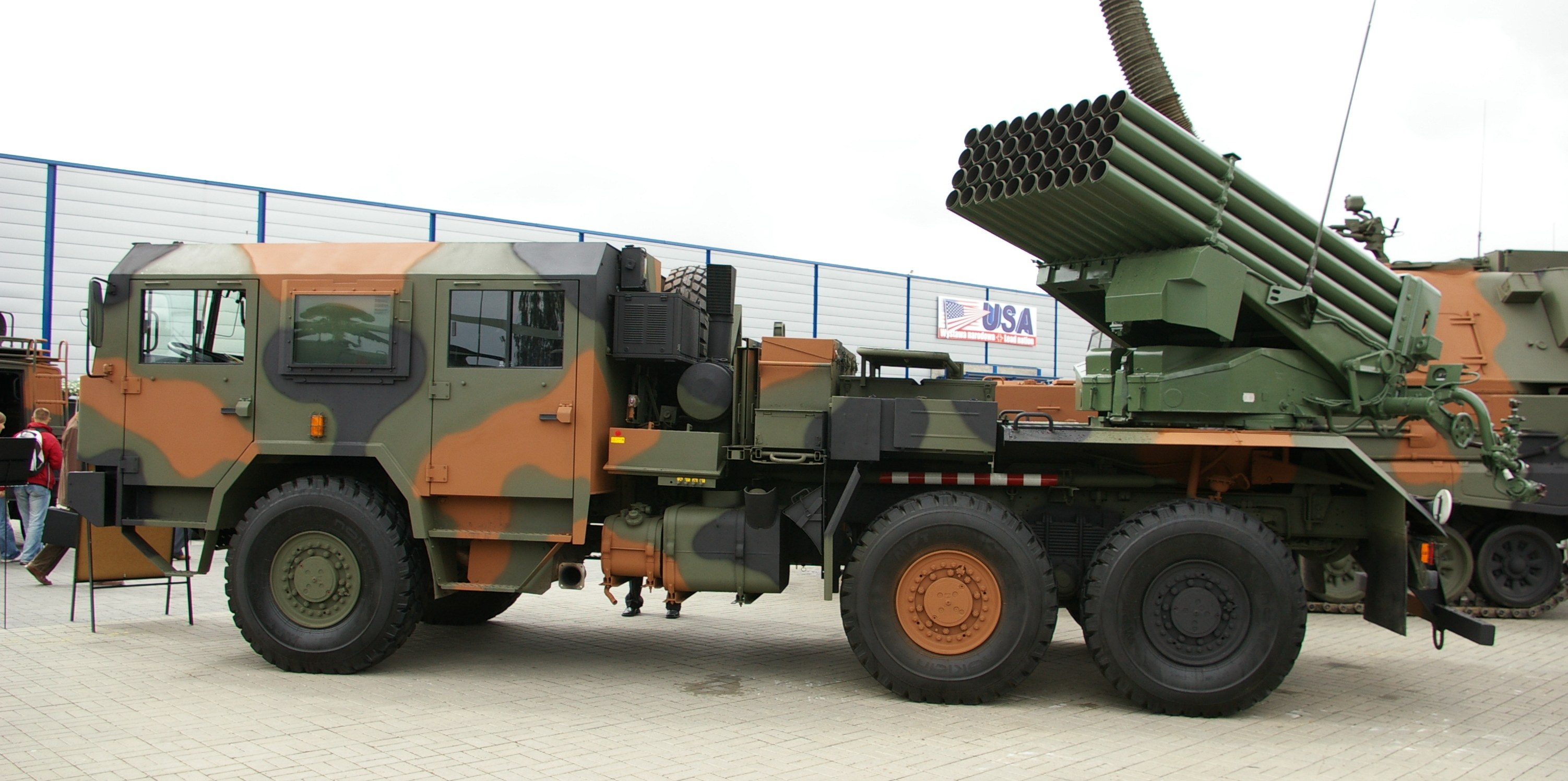
- WR-40 prototype
- Type: Self-propelled multiple rocket launcher
- Place of origin: Poland

Service history
- Used by: Polish Land Forces

Production history
- Designed: 2006
- Manufacturer: Huta Stalowa Wola

Specifications
- Mass: 17,000 kilograms (37,479 lb)
- Length: 8.58 m (28 ft 2 in)
- Width: 2.54 m (8 ft 4 in)
- Height: 2.74 m (9 ft)
- Crew: 4
- Caliber: 122.4 mm (4.8 in)
- Barrels: 40
- Maximum firing range: ≥42 km
- Armor: Steel
- Engine: Iveco Aifo Cursor 8 EURO 3; 259 kW (347 hp)
- Suspension: 6x6 wheeled
- Operational range: 650 km (400 mi)
- Maximum speed: 85 km/h (53 mph)

WR-40 Langusta (English: crawfish) is a Polish self-propelled multiple rocket launcher developed by Huta Stalowa Wola. The first 32 units of the WR-40 entered service in 2010.

The Langusta is based on a deeply modernized and reworked Soviet Cold War-era BM-21 launcher. The old petrol Ural-375D truck chassis was replaced with a modern one, and the launcher was fitted with a fire control system. The carrier used is Polish 6x6 Jelcz truck model P662D.35 with low-profile armoured cabin for the whole crew. Also new ammunition, Feniks, with a 42 km (26 mi) range was adopted.

The prototype was made in 2006 and given to the army in 2007, after successful trials. A series modernization of 75 vehicles followed.

Another step in the modernization of Polish rocket artillery is project 'Homar', corresponding to HIMARS rocket system, carried on from 2007.

== See also ==
- BM-21 Grad – (Soviet Union)
- RS-122 – (Georgia)
- RM-70 multiple rocket launcher – (Czechoslovakia)
