= KrAZ-6322 =

Ukrainian six-wheel drive truck

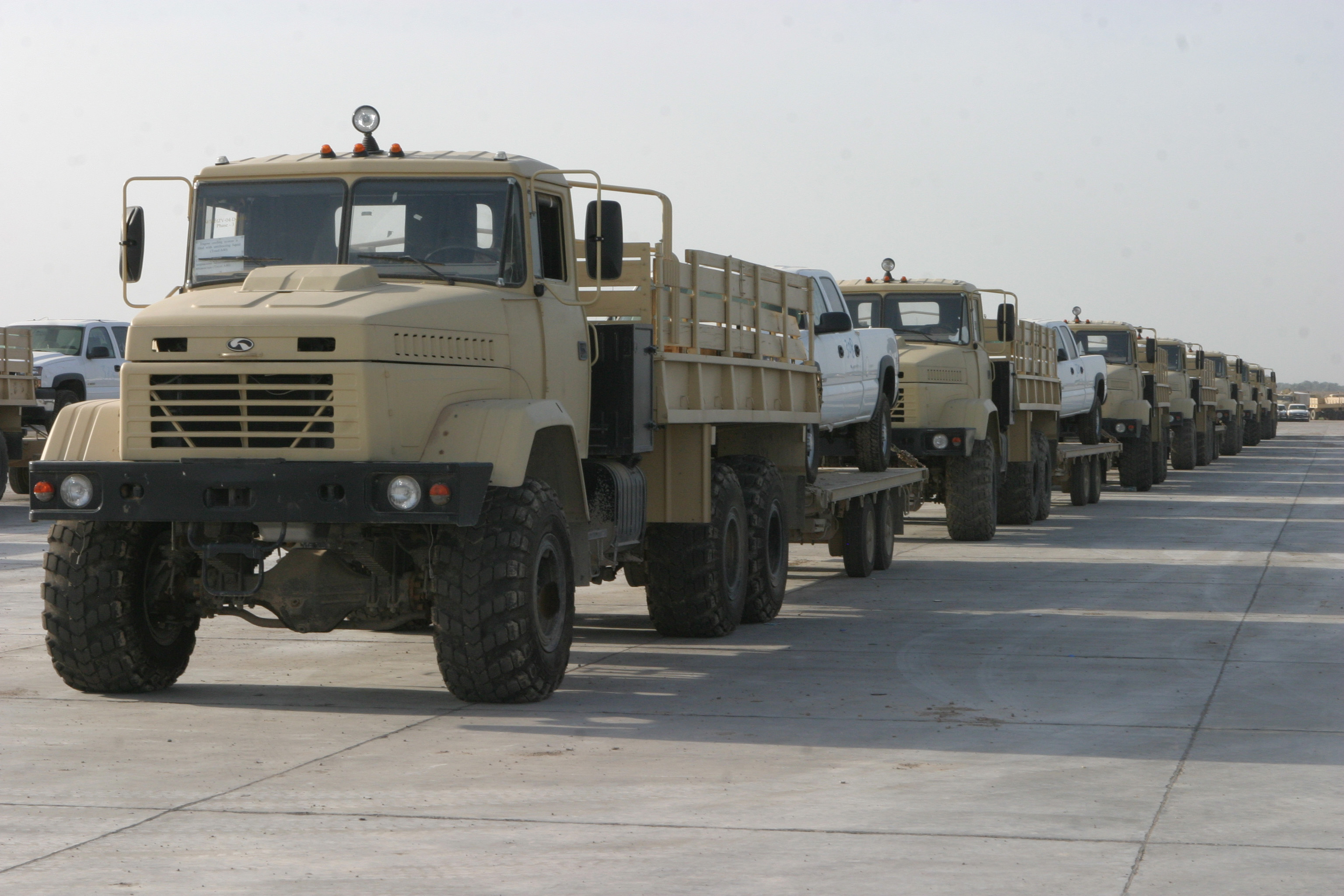

Overview
- Manufacturer: KrAZ
- Production: 1994–present

Body and chassis
- Class: Truck
- Body style: Truck
- Related: KrAZ-5233

Powertrain
- Engine: YaMZ-238DE2 V8 diesel
- Transmission: 5-speed manual

Dimensions
- Curb weight: 12,100 kg (26,680 lb)

Chronology
- Predecessor: KrAZ-260

The KrAZ-6322 is a Ukrainian off-road six-wheel drive truck intended for extreme conditions. It has been produced since 1994 and is manufactured at the KrAZ factory in Kremenchuk, Ukraine. It was first presented at the 1994 defense industry trade show in Kyiv, Ukraine.

== Technical characteristics ==
KrAZ-6322 specifications include:

- Engine: YaMZ 238DE2 14.86 L 8 cyl turbodiesel, after 2014 Ford-Ecotorq 9.0l
- Power: 330 PS (243 kW) at 2400 RPM
- Torque: 1,225 N⋅m (904 lbf⋅ft) at 1225 RPM
- Top speed: 121 km/h (75 mph)

== Variants ==
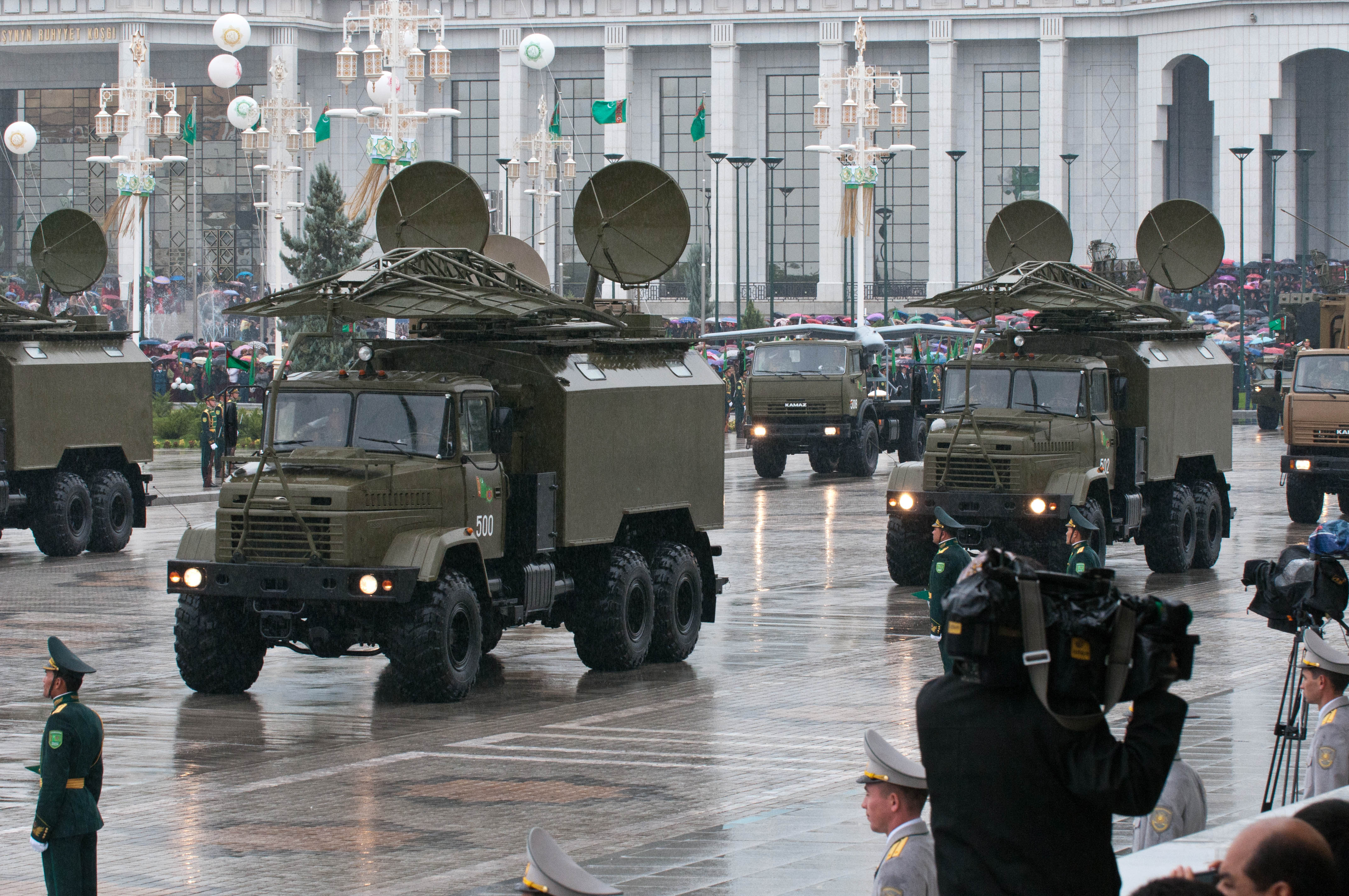
KrAZ-63221REB-01 «Sentry» at a military parade in Turkmenistan, 2011

- KrAZ-6322 "Soldier" (КрАЗ-6322 «Солдат») - cargo truck
- KrAZ-6322 AF1 (КрАЗ-6322 АФ1) - KUNG on KrAZ-6322 chassis
- KrAZ-6322RA (КрАЗ-6322РА) - BM-21 Grad on KrAZ-6322 chassis
- KrAZ-6322 "Raptor"
- KrAZ "Feona" - MRAP on KrAZ-6322 chassis
- KrAZ "Forpost" (КрАЗ "Форпост") - MRAP on KrAZ-6322 chassis
- KrAZ-63221 (КрАЗ-63221)
- RS-122 (დრს-122) - BM-21 Grad on KrAZ-63221 chassis
- ATs-12-63221 (АЦ-12-63221) - fuel tanker on KrAZ-63221 chassis
- ATsTV-10 (АЦТВ-10) — water tanker on KrAZ-63221 chassis
- АКТ-2/5 (63221) - fire truck on KrAZ-63221 chassis
- KrAZ-63221REB-01 «Sentry» (КрАЗ-6322РЭБ-01 «Часовой») - Kolchuga passive sensor on KrAZ-63221 chassis

== Operators ==
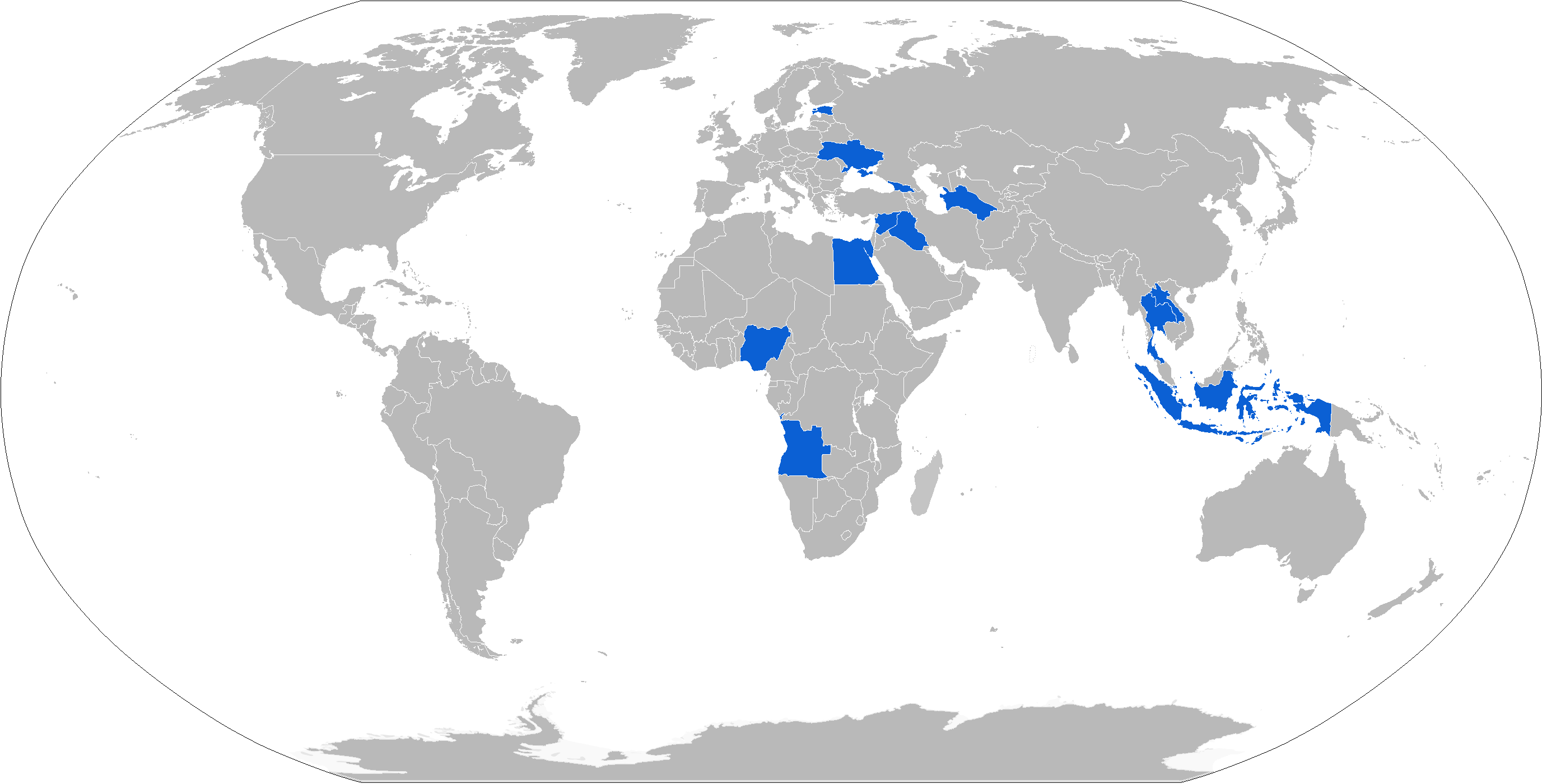
Map with KrAZ-6322 operators in blue

- Angola
- Egypt – ordered for Egyptian Armed Forces in 2012. Several hundred delivered to Egyptian Army.
- Estonia – 4 trucks with TMM-3M motorized bridges bought in 2015.
- Georgia – main transport and utility vehicle of the Defense Forces of Georgia
- Indonesia – in 2008 15 sold to Indonesian National Police.
- Iran
- Iraq – ordered for Iraq Armed Forces in June 2004. 2,150 were delivered to Iraq until June 2007.
- Laos
- Nigeria – sold to Nigerian Armed Forces
- Syria – 70 sold to Syrian Armed Forces
- Thailand – ordered for Royal Thai Armed Forces in April 2013. First ones delivered to Royal Thai Army in October 2013.
- Turkmenistan
- Ukraine – adopted as military truck for the Ukrainian Armed Forces in 2006. In February 2008 first 15 trucks were delivered to Ukrainian Army.
