= BR-386 (Brazil highway) =

Highway in Brazil

BR-386

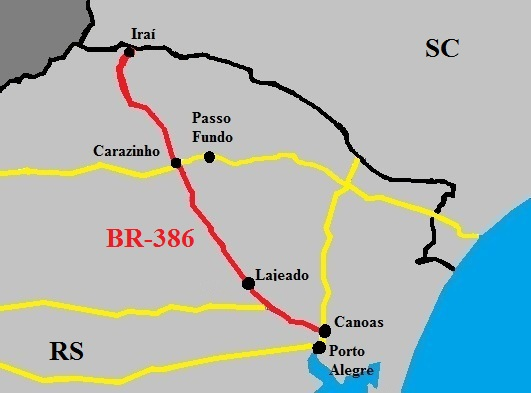

Route information
- Length: 530.4 km (329.6 mi)

Major junctions
- North end: São Miguel do Oeste, Santa Catarina
- South end: Porto Alegre, Rio Grande do Sul

Location
- Country: Brazil
- State: Rio Grande do Sul

Highway system
- Highways in Brazil; Federal; Rio Grande do Sul State Highways

The BR-386 is a Brazilian federal highway running between the southern states of Rio Grande do Sul and Santa Catarina. It has a total length of 525 km (326 mi).

== Economic Importance ==
The highway is called the Production Highway due to its high importance for the state. It is used to transport all the production of soy, corn, wheat, meat, wood, furniture, and other products of the region. In the city of Ametista do Sul, close to Iraí, there is the largest production of amethyst in the world. Close to Lajeado is one of the largest productions of tobacco on the planet. In Santa Catarina, the highway ends near Chapecó, the largest regional hub in the west of the state. In general, cities with significant GDP are on the side of the highway.

== Duplication ==
The 66 km stretch between Canoas and Tabaí was doubled before 2010. The 34 km duplication between Tabaí and Estrela started in 2010 and only ended in 2018, due to the financial crisis in Brazil and the purposeful obstacles carried out by FUNAI, socialists, and indigenous communities. The 7 km stretch between Estrela and Lajeado was also doubled before 2010.

In 2019, the highway was granted for 30 years to CCR Viasul. With that, the highway will be duplicated in the 176 km stretch between Lajeado and Carazinho. The works are expected to start in 2021 and finish in 2036. The duplication works will follow the following order: from Lajeado to Marques de Souza (22 km): between 2021 and 2023; from Estrela to Lajeado (adjustments): between 2022 and 2023; from Fontoura Xavier to Soledade (22 km): between 2023 and 2024; from Soledade to Tio Hugo (33 km): between 2024 and 2025; from Marques de Souza to Fontoura Xavier (55 km): between 2026 and 2028; from Tio Hugo to Carazinho (40 km): between 2029 and 2030; from Tabaí to Canoas (readjustment): between 2034 and 2036.

== Gallery ==
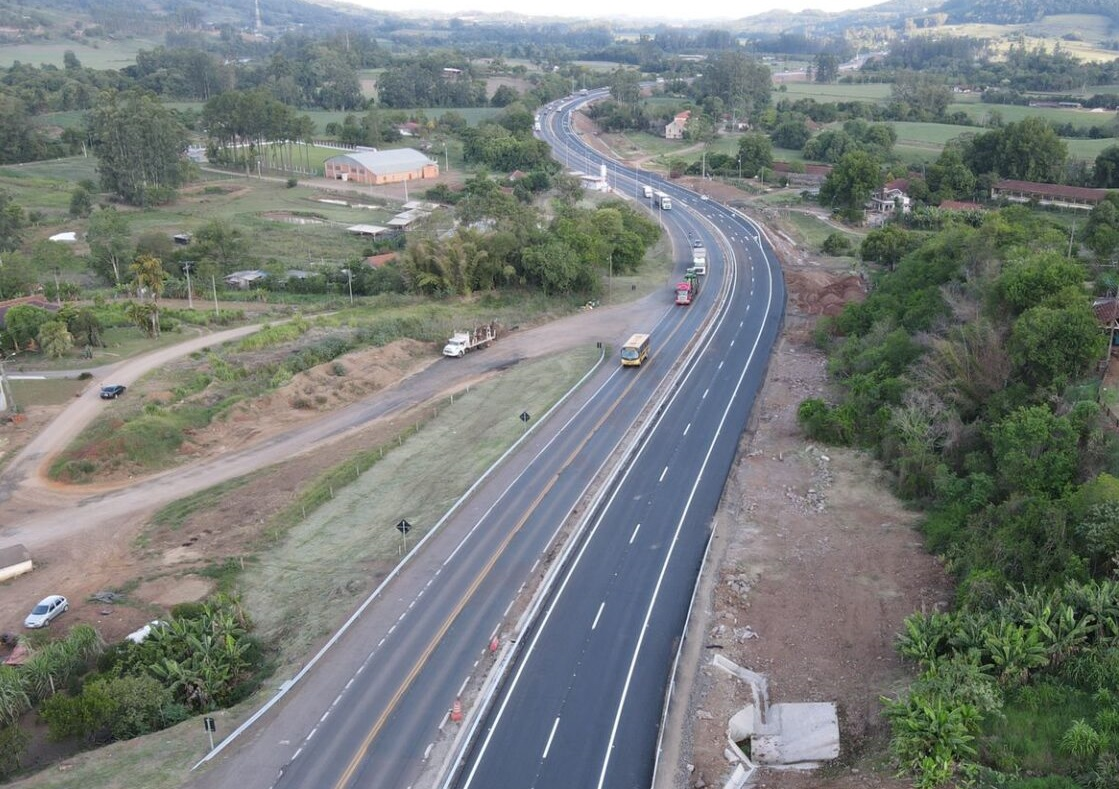
BR-386 in Lajeado
