= Lagoa Vermelha =

Municipality in Rio Grande do Sul, Brazil

Coordinates: 28°12′32″S 51°31′33″W

- Municipality
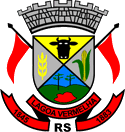
- Flag Coat of arms
- Interactive map of Lagoa Vermelha
- Country: Brazil
- Time zone: UTC−3 (BRT)

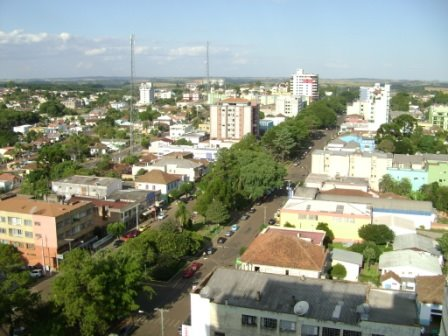

Lagoa Vermelha is a municipality in the state of Rio Grande do Sul, Brazil. As of 2020, the estimated population was 27,778.

== Geography ==
=== Climate ===
Climate data for Lagoa Vermelha (1981–2010)
| Month | Jan | Feb | Mar | Apr | May | Jun | Jul | Aug | Sep | Oct | Nov | Dec | Year |
|---|---|---|---|---|---|---|---|---|---|---|---|---|---|
| Mean daily maximum °C (°F) | 27.1 (80.8) | 27.2 (81.0) | 26.0 (78.8) | 23.4 (74.1) | 19.7 (67.5) | 18.3 (64.9) | 18.0 (64.4) | 19.6 (67.3) | 20.1 (68.2) | 23.4 (74.1) | 25.1 (77.2) | 26.7 (80.1) | 22.9 (73.2) |
| Daily mean °C (°F) | 21.2 (70.2) | 21.0 (69.8) | 19.9 (67.8) | 17.3 (63.1) | 13.9 (57.0) | 12.9 (55.2) | 11.9 (53.4) | 13.3 (55.9) | 14.2 (57.6) | 17.4 (63.3) | 18.9 (66.0) | 20.4 (68.7) | 16.9 (62.4) |
| Mean daily minimum °C (°F) | 16.5 (61.7) | 16.6 (61.9) | 15.6 (60.1) | 13.1 (55.6) | 9.9 (49.8) | 9.2 (48.6) | 7.7 (45.9) | 8.7 (47.7) | 9.9 (49.8) | 12.9 (55.2) | 14.1 (57.4) | 15.5 (59.9) | 12.5 (54.5) |
| Average precipitation mm (inches) | 133.7 (5.26) | 130.9 (5.15) | 118.1 (4.65) | 119.2 (4.69) | 133.7 (5.26) | 133.1 (5.24) | 130.8 (5.15) | 128.5 (5.06) | 191.4 (7.54) | 198.2 (7.80) | 156.5 (6.16) | 114.0 (4.49) | 1,688.1 (66.46) |
| Mean monthly sunshine hours | 193.5 | 186.2 | 191.3 | 170.8 | 152.6 | 124.1 | 160.0 | 159.5 | 149.0 | 155.6 | 171.0 | 195.7 | 2,009.3 |
Source: Instituto Nacional de Meteorologia

== See also ==
- List of municipalities in Rio Grande do Sul
