= Carazinho =

City in Rio Grande do Sul, Brazil

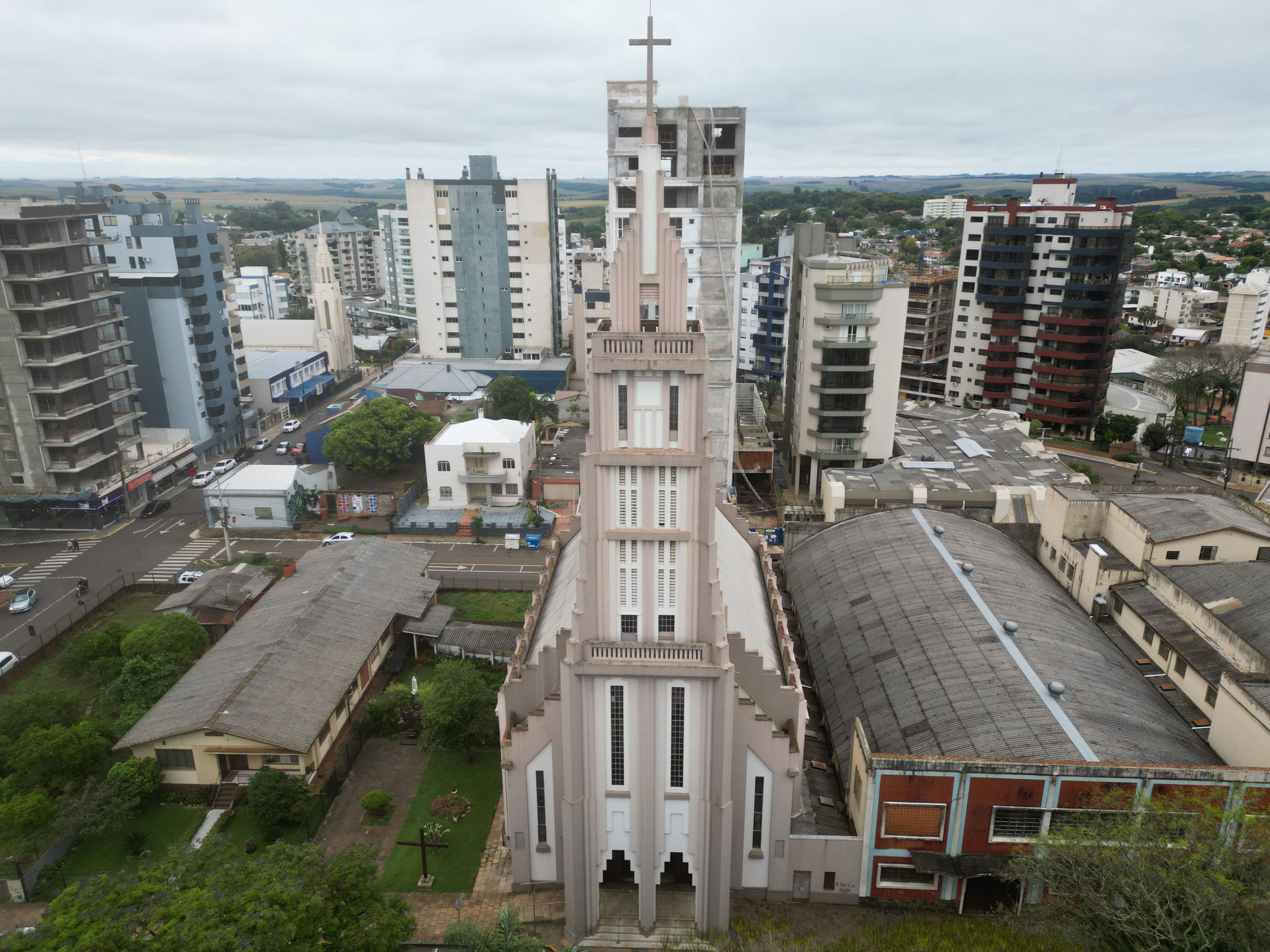
- View of Carazinho

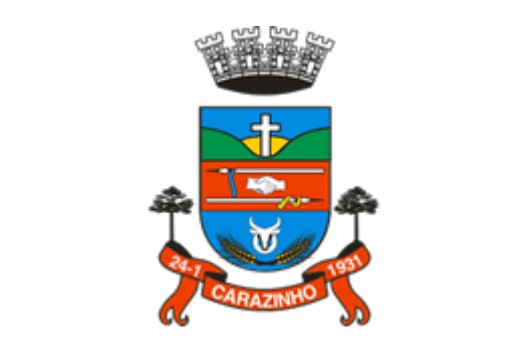
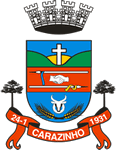
- Flag Coat of arms

- Location in Brazil
- Coordinates: 28°17′02″S 52°47′09″W
- Country: Brazil
- State: Rio Grande do Sul
- Region: South
- Mesoregion: Mesoregion Nordeste Rio-Grandense
- Microregion: Carazinho
- Founded: 24 January 1931

Government
  - Mayor: Milton Schmitz (MDB)

Area
  - City: 676 km^{2} (261 sq mi)
- Elevation: 603 m (1,978 ft)

Population (2020)
  - City: 62,265
  - Density: 92.1/km^{2} (239/sq mi)
  - Rural: 1,064
  - Metro: 58,253
- Demonym: carazinhense
- Time zone: UTC−3 (BRT)
- Postal Code: 99500-000
- Area code: +55 54
- Website: www.carazinho.rs.gov.br

Carazinho is a city located 246 km from Porto Alegre, in the northwest portion of the Brazilian state of Rio Grande do Sul. Carazinho was founded on 1931 and as of 2020 has a population of 62,265. Carazinho's primary economy is focused on agriculture. Soybeans, corn and wheat are the major products.

Carazinho can be accessed via BR-285 or BR-386, which are major roads in Rio Grande do Sul.

It has an elevation of 603 meters and an area of 676 km²

A significant part of Carazinho's population is of German origin.

== See also ==
- List of municipalities in Rio Grande do Sul
