= BR-470 (Brazil highway) =

Highway in Brazil

BR-470

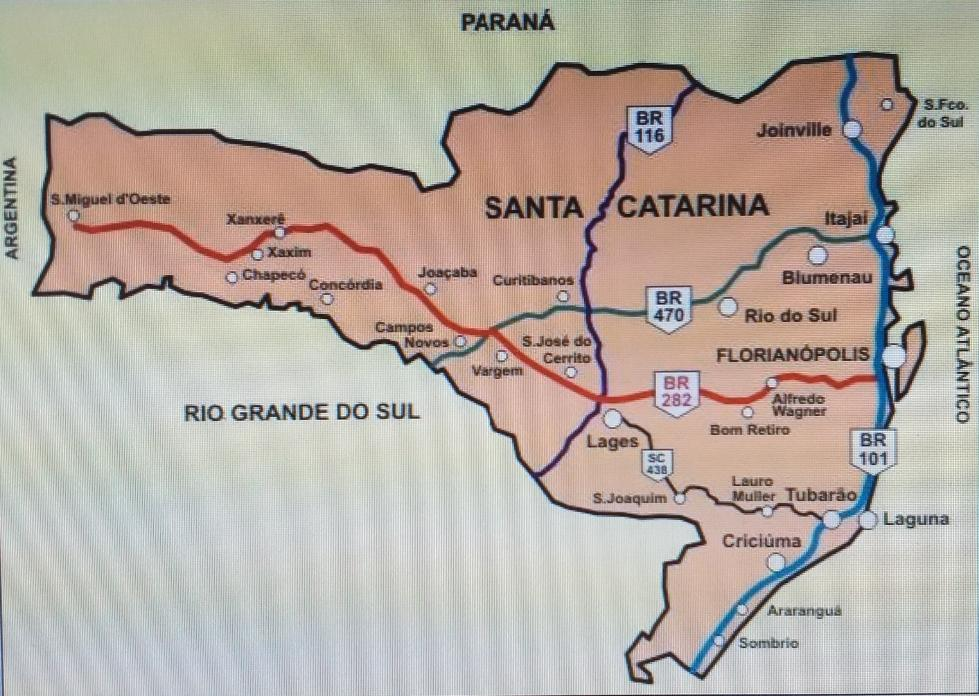

Route information
- Length: 832.9 km (517.5 mi)

Major junctions
- East end: Navegantes, Santa Catarina
- BR-101; BR-116; BR-285; BR-282
- West end: Camaquã, Rio Grande do Sul

Location
- Country: Brazil

Highway system
- Highways in Brazil; Federal

BR-470 is an east-west Brazilian federal highway that starts in Navegantes, Santa Catarina, and crosses the Gaucho range and highlands. It stretches approximately 833 km, passing through cities such as Itajaí, Blumenau, Rio do Sul, Curitibanos, Campos Novos, Bento Gonçalves, Veranópolis and Montenegro and ends in Camaquã, Rio Grande do Sul.

It's primarily a single lane highway, historically and economically important for connecting the plateau and western Santa Catarina with the coast. It is the main "artery" of the Itajaí Valley and also one of the main access routes to the Port of Itajaí (the main port in the region, being the second largest in the country in handling containers, acting as a port for export and draining almost all state production, where the main exported products are wood, ceramic floors, machinery, sugar, paper and tobacco, as well as imported products such as wheat, chemical products, motors and textiles) and the Navegantes airport (the largest of the state) Santa Catarina, also of great tourist importance). Currently, 73 km are being duplicated in the most important and busiest section, between the urban centers of Navegantes, Gaspar, Blumenau and Indaial, where the state's textile, glass, porcelain and metalworking industries are concentrated. The completion of the duplication will have to do with a large increase in the logistics and economic capacity of the cities, the Port of Itajaí, the Navegantes Airport and in the flow of production from the west of the state and part of the Serra Catarinense.

It has winding and poorly marked sections in the state of Santa Catarina, as well as unpaved or non-existent areas in Rio Grande do Sul. There are also risks in the ascent and descent of Serra Geral, between Pouso Redondo and the access to Otacílio Costa (SC), section known as Serra da Santinha in which many vehicles suffer accidents. In the section that includes Veranópolis and Bento Gonçalves, known as Serra das Antas, there is an intense traffic of slow vehicles (trucks loaded most of the time) that join the few passing points and the precarious conditions of the asphalt end up leaving the slow traffic. There is also a lack of shoulder on this stretch, as the few escape areas that did exist were eventually used to build third lanes, in order to alleviate some of the traffic there.

== Duplication ==
Dilma Rousseff promised in 2011 the doubling of 73 km of the highway, between Indaial and Navegantes, in addition to the concession to the private sector of the Santa Catarina section. The work started only in 2013, and had just over 9 km duplicates delivered, in 2019 alone, under the government of Jair Bolsonaro. The first 8 km of track were launched in June 2019, from km 22 to km 30, between the municipalities of Ilhota and Gaspar. In August 2019, 1.3 km were delivered between 0.00 and 18.61 km, between Navegantes and Ilhota. The expectation is to deliver the 73 km doubled in 2022.

With the delivery of the Mafisa Clover (one of the most complicated and expensive sections of the project), 23.8 km of duplications had already been released by August 2020.
