= Novo Cabrais =

Municipality of Rio Grande do Sul, Brazil

- Municipality
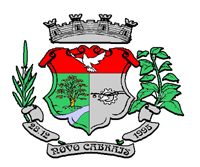
- Flag Coat of arms

- Location within Rio Grande do Sul

- Location in Brazil
- Coordinates: 29°44′06″S 52°56′52″W
- Country: Brazil
- State: Rio Grande do Sul

Population (2022)
  - Total: 3,568
- Time zone: UTC−3 (BRT)

Novo Cabrais is a municipality in the state of Rio Grande do Sul, Brazil.

== See also ==
- List of municipalities in Rio Grande do Sul
