= Centro Oriental Rio-Grandense =

Coordinates: 29.7240°S 52.4340°W

- Mesoregion
- Country: Brazil
- State: Rio Grande do Sul

Area
  - Total: 17,192.04 km^{2} (6,637.88 sq mi)

Population (2005)
  - Total: 775,276
  - Density: 45.0951/km^{2} (116.796/sq mi)

The Centro Oriental Rio-Grandense (Eastern Center of Rio Grande) is one of the seven Mesoregion of the state of Rio Grande do Sul in Brazil. It consists of 54 municipalities, grouped in three Microregions:

- Cachoeira do Sul
- Lajeado-Estrela
- Santa Cruz do Sul
