= RS-122 =

Georgian self-propelled rocket launcher

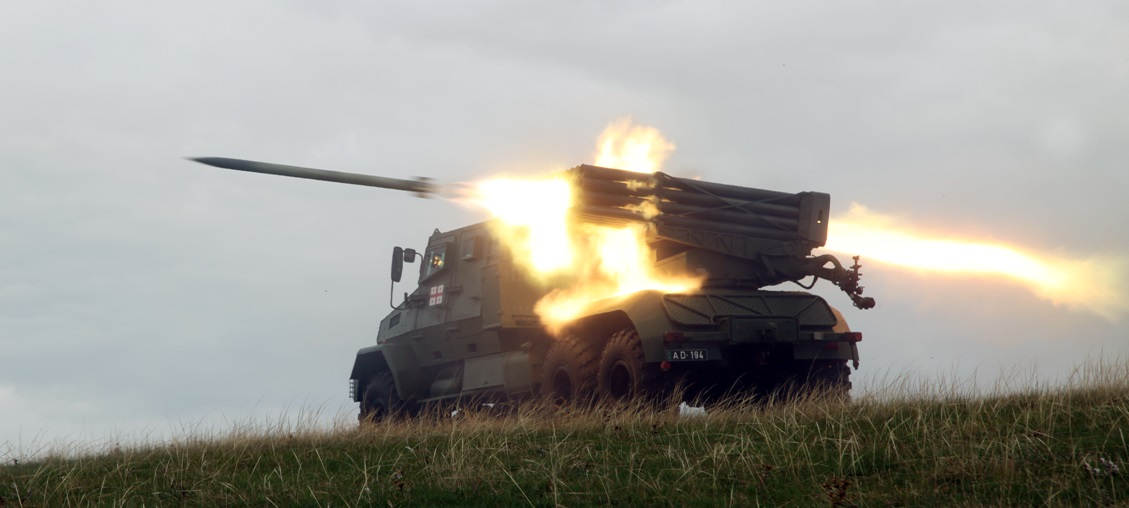
- RS-122 shown during a 2012 military demonstration at Georgia's Vaziani training ground.
- Type: Multiple rocket launcher
- Place of origin: Georgia

Service history
- In service: 2012-present
- Used by: Georgia
- Wars: None

Production history
- Designer: STC Delta
- Designed: 2011
- Manufacturer: STC Delta
- Developed from: BM-21 Grad
- Produced: 2012-present
- No. built: 8+
- Variants: RS-122 "Magaria"; GG-122

Specifications (Technical specifications)
- Mass: 20 tonnes
- Length: 8.5m
- Width: 2.7m
- Height: 3.26m
- Crew: 5
- Shell: 122 mm rockets (Grad-compatible)
- Shell weight: 66kg
- Barrels: 40 tubes
- Action: Electrically-fired, multiple rocket launcher
- Carriage: Self-propelled 6×6 wheeled chassis (KrAZ-63221)
- Elevation: 0° to +60°
- Traverse: ±120°
- Rate of fire: 2 rockets per second (full salvo in ~20 seconds)
- Muzzle velocity: 690 m/s
- Maximum firing range: 45 km
- Feed system: 40-tube launcher
- Sights: Digital fire-control system with GPS and laser rangefinder
- Warhead: TNT or A-IX-2 (depending on rocket type)
- Warhead weight: ~18 kg (per rocket)
- Detonation mechanism: Point-detonating fuze
- Blast yield: Fragmentation and blast over radius of ~28 m
- Armour: STANAG 4569 Level 2 (armored cabin)
- Main armament: 40 × 122 mm rocket launch tubes
- Engine: YaMZ-238C diesel engine 330 hp (246 kW)
- Power/weight: ~16.5 hp/tonne
- Payload capacity: 40 rockets (one full load)
- Drive: 6×6 wheeled
- Transmission: Manual (unspecified model)
- Suspension: Leaf spring suspension
- Ground clearance: ~400 mm (estimate, based on KrAZ-63221 chassis)
- Fuel capacity: 330–350 liters (typical for KrAZ-63221)
- Operational range: ~500 km
- Maximum speed: 80 km/h (on road)
- Steering system: Front axle (conventional wheel steering)

The RS-122 is a self-propelled multiple rocket launcher system developed by Georgia in the early 2010s to replace and modernize its fleet of aging Soviet-era BM-21 Grad systems. Designed and manufactured by the State Military Scientific-Technical Center Delta (STC Delta), the RS-122 marked Georgia's first domestically produced artillery rocket system and was part of a broader post-war initiative to improve the survivability, accuracy, and autonomy of its armed forces following the 2008 Russo–Georgian War.

The system is based on a Ukrainian KrAZ-63221 6×6 chassis and is equipped with 40 launch tubes for 122 mm Grad-compatible rockets. It features a fully armored cabin, digital fire control, and GPS-assisted targeting, enabling rapid deployment and operation without exposing the crew. The baseline model, known informally as Magaria, entered service in 2012, and an upgraded variant with expanded crew capacity and improved optics, known as GG-122, was publicly displayed in 2014.

Although conceived with export potential in mind, the RS-122 has not been sold abroad and remains in limited service with the Georgian Defense Forces. It has been used primarily in training and evaluation exercises, and its development is seen as a symbolic and strategic step toward Georgia's goal of defense self-sufficiency.

== Background ==
In the aftermath of the 2008 Russo–Georgian War, the Georgian Armed Forces conducted a broad reassessment of their military capabilities, with particular attention to artillery systems. The war had exposed significant limitations in Georgia’s Soviet-era equipment, including the BM-21 Grad multiple rocket launcher. These systems lacked modern fire control, armored protection for crews, and the mobility needed to survive and respond quickly on a modern battlefield. As Russia fielded more advanced and better-coordinated artillery forces during the conflict, Georgia identified a pressing need to modernize its own systems.

This modernization effort coincided with a strategic shift toward domestic defense production. The Georgian government prioritized military self-reliance, partly to reduce dependence on foreign suppliers and especially to avoid vulnerabilities tied to Russian-manufactured hardware. In 2010, the State Military Scientific-Technical Center Delta (STC Delta), a state-owned defense enterprise under Georgia's Ministry of Defense, was tasked with developing a modern multiple rocket launcher system that would retain compatibility with the widely used 122 mm Grad rockets while addressing the survivability and targeting deficiencies of legacy systems.

The resulting design, later designated RS-122, was conceived as a next-generation platform incorporating improved crew protection, digital fire control, and enhanced battlefield mobility. The system was mounted on the Ukrainian KrAZ-63221 6×6 truck chassis, selected for its proven durability and off-road performance, as well as for its availability through non-Russian supply channels. The RS-122 also reflected broader international trends in post-Soviet artillery modernization, drawing informal influence from Poland’s WR-40 Langusta and other NATO-compatible Grad upgrades.

Although designed with an eye toward potential export markets, the RS-122 primarily served as a demonstration of Georgia's emerging domestic defense manufacturing capabilities. It marked a departure from complete reliance on Soviet-era systems and was promoted as a symbol of technological independence within Georgia's broader military modernization strategy.

== History ==
The RS‑122 program began in 2011 when Georgia's State Military Scientific‑Technical Center Delta (STC Delta) initiated development of a new Grad‑compatible multiple rocket launcher system. The primary aim was to address shortcomings revealed during the 2008 Russo–Georgian War, particularly outdated Soviet equipment that lacked modern targeting, protection, and mobility.

By February–March 2012, STC Delta had completed the RS‑122 prototype and presented it at the Vaziani military firing range, where it was demonstrated to Georgian military and government leadership. This demonstration included a live-fire test showing the platform's ability to deploy a full salvo from within an armored crew cabin, showcasing its digital fire-control system, rapid deployment, and enhanced crew protection.

Following the successful trials, STC Delta approved limited production of the RS‑122, beginning in 2012. As of the mid-2010s, approximately eight or more units had been delivered to the Georgian Defense Forces. The launcher was based on the KrAZ‑63221 6×6 chassis, selected for its rugged off-road capability and availability outside of Russian supply chains.

In 2014, a further variant known as the GG‑122 (also referred to as RS‑122M) was publicly showcased. This version featured an extended armored cabin accommodating six crew members and additional improvements in fire-control flexibility and automation, although no evidence suggests it entered mass production.

To date, no units of the RS‑122 have been exported, and the system has seen service exclusively with Georgia's rocket artillery brigades.

== Design details ==
The RS-122 is a self-propelled multiple rocket launcher system featuring a 40-tube launcher compatible with 122 mm rockets, mounted on a KrAZ-63221 6×6 heavy-duty truck chassis. The launch module is designed to fire standard BM-21 Grad-type unguided rockets, with a maximum range of up to 45 kilometers depending on the ammunition type. The launcher is capable of delivering a full salvo of 40 rockets in approximately 20 seconds.

The vehicle is powered by a YaMZ-238C V8 diesel engine, producing 330 horsepower, and is paired with a manual transmission. This configuration allows for a top road speed of 80 kilometers per hour and an operational range of approximately 500 kilometers. The RS-122 is equipped with a leaf spring suspension system and offers a ground clearance of approximately 400 millimeters, enabling cross-country mobility in rugged terrain.

The crew cabin is fully enclosed and armored to STANAG 4569 Level 2, providing protection against 7.62 mm armor-piercing rounds and shell splinters. The cabin accommodates a crew of five and includes integrated blast-resistant seating and internal launch controls. The firing system is digitally operated, incorporating satellite navigation (GPS/GLONASS), a laser rangefinder, and a fire-control computer. These systems allow for faster targeting and greater accuracy than traditional Grad platforms, and in most firing configurations, the crew is not required to exit the vehicle.

Reloading is performed manually from accompanying support vehicles and typically takes several minutes. The system does not feature any form of autoloader or automated rearming system. Secondary armament is not fitted, and the vehicle relies on mobility and off-site positioning for survivability.

The launch tubes are arranged in a rectangular 4×10 configuration and offer an elevation range from 0° to +60°, with traverse of approximately ±120°. The RS-122's overall length is 8.5 meters, width 2.7 meters, and height 3.26 meters, with a combat weight of approximately 20 tonnes.

== Variants ==
=== RS-122 (Magaria) ===
Introduced in 2012, the RS-122 baseline variant is commonly known as Magaria (Georgian slang for "awesome" or "cool"). It features the core design: a 40‑tube 122 mm Grad-compatible launcher mounted on a KrAZ‑63221 chassis, with a fully armored STANAG 4569 Level 2 crew cabin, integrated digital fire control, and salvo launch capability from within the vehicle. A live-fire demonstration in early 2012 showcased its modern targeting and protection enhancements

=== GG-122 (RS-122M) ===
The GG-122 is an upgraded variant of the RS-122, first publicly revealed in 2014. It retains the 40-tube launch configuration and KrAZ-63221 platform but incorporates a larger armored cabin with seating for six crew members. The GG-122 features improved digital and optical fire-control components, including an enhanced ballistic computer and expanded situational awareness systems. The variant is sometimes informally referred to as "RS-122M," although no official designation has been confirmed. There is no publicly available evidence that the GG-122 has entered serial production.

== Production ==
Production of the RS‑122 began in 2012, following successful trials and a public demonstration at the Vaziani military training ground earlier that year. The system was developed and manufactured by the State Military Scientific-Technical Center Delta (STC Delta), a Georgian state-owned defense company operating under the Ministry of Defense. The launcher was produced using a combination of domestically developed subsystems and imported components, most notably the KrAZ‑63221 6×6 chassis, which was sourced from Ukraine.

The RS‑122 was manufactured in limited numbers, with open-source estimates indicating that at least eight units were completed and entered service with the Georgian Defense Forces. There are no known international orders, and the system has not been exported as of 2025. While the design was developed with export potential in mind, production appears to have remained focused on fulfilling domestic requirements.

A further variant, the GG‑122, was publicly showcased in 2014 but has not been confirmed to have entered serial production. The RS‑122 remains in low-rate service.

== Gallery ==
An RS-122 on display during a military exhibition in Tbilisi.

Rear view of the RS-122.

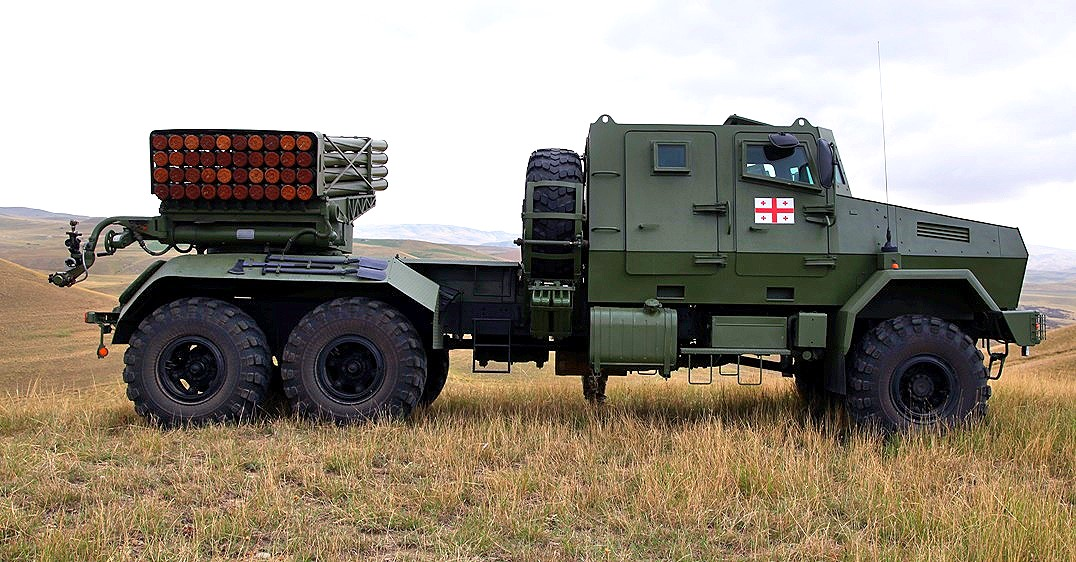
Side profile of an RS‑122, clearly showing its 40-tube launcher and armored KrAZ‑63221 6×6 chassis hull on display.

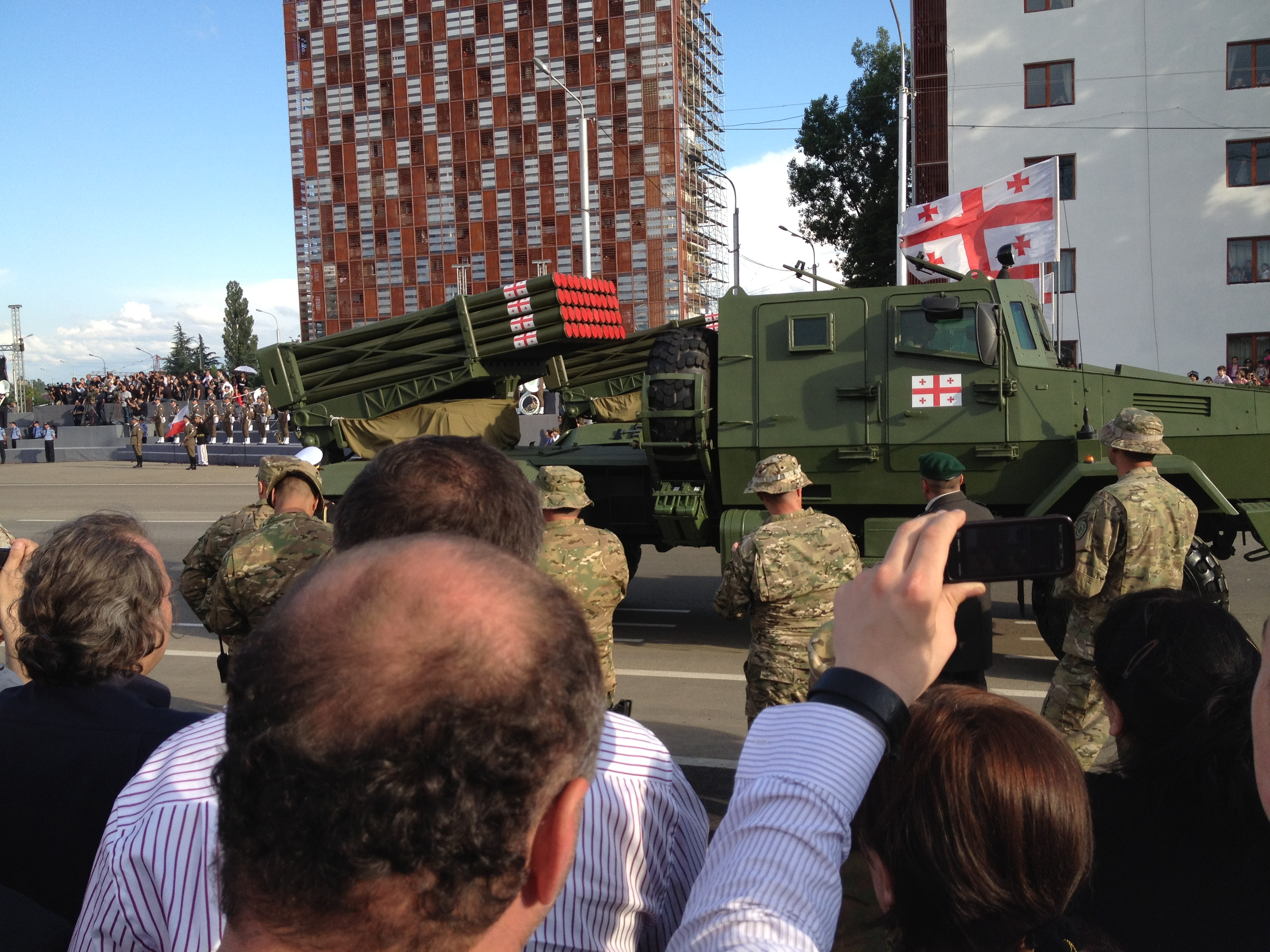
An RS‑122 rolling through central Kutaisi during the Georgian Independence Day military parade, 2012.

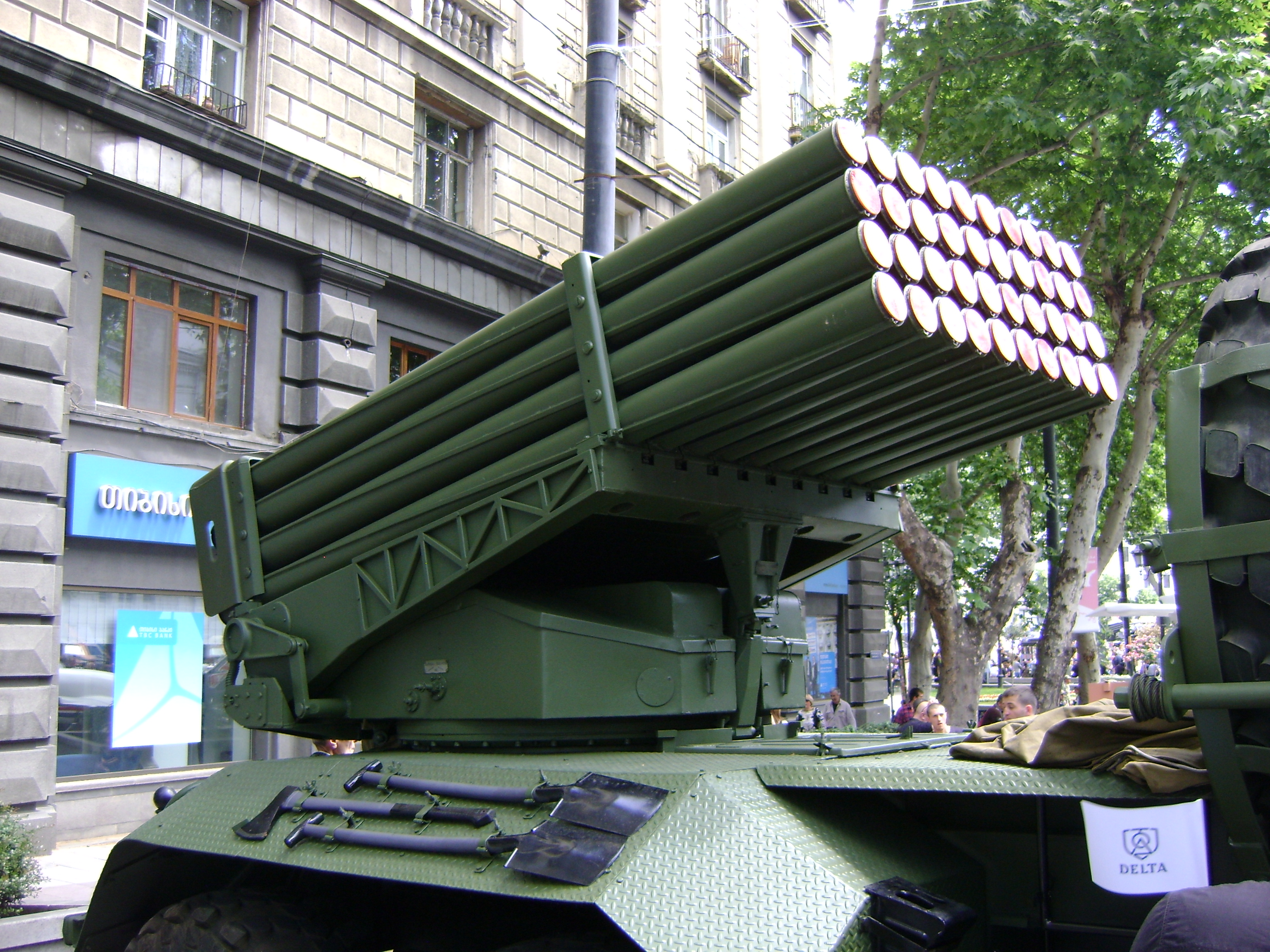
An RS‑122 on display during the Georgian Independence Day celebration and military exhibition in Tbilisi on May 26, 2014.

== See also ==
- BM-21 Grad – (Soviet Union)
- RM-70 multiple rocket launcher – (Czechoslovakia)
- WR-40 Langusta – (Poland)
