= List of state highways in Rio Grande do Sul =

Highway shield from RS-122, a road in the Serra Gaúcha (Gaucho Range) that is part of the Caminhos da Colônia (Paths of the Colony) tourist route that passes through cities settled by Italian immigrants.

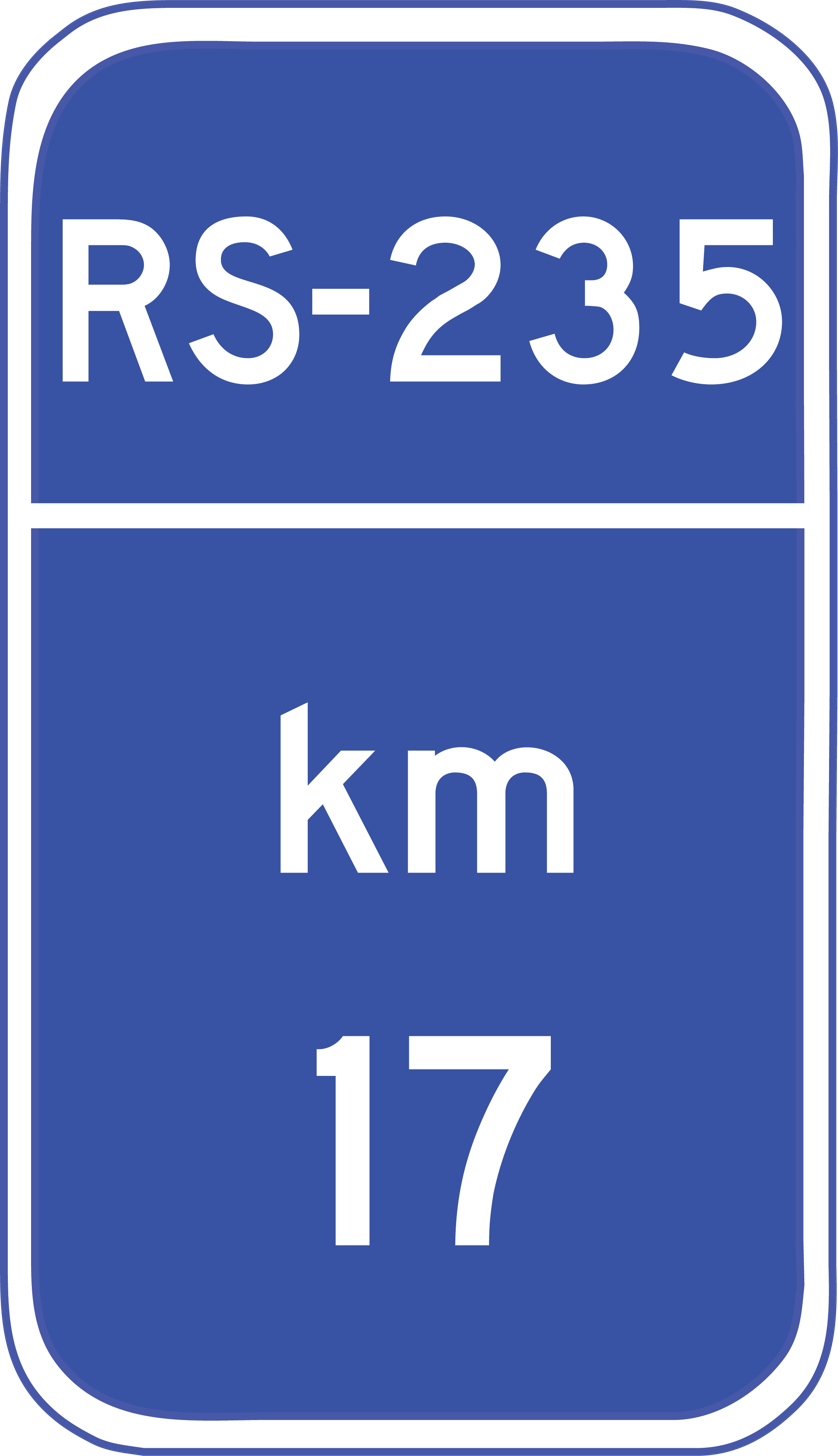
Highway location marker from RS-235, one of the roads that is part of the Rota Romântica (Romantic Road route) in southern Brazil that passes through cities settled by German immigrants.

Highway shield from RS-389, a road that passes by one of the state's beaches.

This is a list of state highways in Rio Grande do Sul, Brazil.

== Radial Highways ==
- RS-010
- RS-020
- RS-030
- RS-040
- RS-089

== North-South Highways ==
- RS-110
- RS-115
- RS-118
- RS-122
- RS-124
- RS-126
- RS-128
- RS-129
- RS-130
- RS-132
- RS-135
- RS-137
- RS-142
- RS-143
- RS-149
- RS-150
- RS-153
- RS-155
- RS-162
- RS-165
- RS-168
- RS-176
- RS-183

== East-West Highways ==
- RS-207
- RS-208
- RS-210
- RS-211
- RS-218
- RS-223
- RS-230
- RS-235
- RS-239
- RS-240
- RS-241
- RS-242
- RS-244
- RS-265

== Diagonal highways ==
- RS-305
- RS-307
- RS-315
- RS-317
- RS-323
- RS-324
- RS-325
- RS-330
- RS-331
- RS-332
- RS-342
- RS-343
- RS-344
- RS-347
- RS-348
- RS-350
- RS-354
- RS-355
- RS-357
- RS-359
- RS-373
- RS-389

== Linking Highways ==
- RS-400
- RS-401
- RS-402
- RS-403
- RS-404
- RS-405
- RS-406
- RS-407
- RS-409
- RS-410
- RS-411
- RS-412
- RS-413
- RS-415
- RS-416
- RS-417
- RS-418
- RS-419
- RS-420
- RS-421
- RS-422
- RS-423
- RS-424
- RS-425
- RS-426
- RS-427
- RS-428
- RS-430
- RS-431
- RS-432
- RS-433
- RS-434
- RS-435
- RS-436
- RS-437
- RS-438
- RS-439
- RS-440
- RS-441
- RS-442
- RS-444
- RS-445
- RS-446
- RS-447
- RS-448
- RS-450
- RS-451
- RS-452
- RS-453
- RS-456
- RS-457
- RS-458
- RS-460
- RS-461
- RS-462
- RS-463
- RS-464
- RS-465
- RS-466
- RS-467
- RS-469
- RS-474
- RS-475
- RS-476
- RS-477
- RS-478
- RS-481
- RS-482
- RS-483
- RS-484
- RS-486
- RS-487
- RS-491
- RS-492
- RS-494
- RS-500
- RS-502
- RS-504
- RS-505
- RS-506
- RS-507
- RS-508
- RS-509
- RS-510
- RS-511
- RS-512
- RS-514
- RS-516
- RS-518
- RS-520
- RS-522
- RS-524
- RS-525
- RS-526
- RS-527
- RS-528
- RS-529
- RS-531
- RS-532
- RS-533
- RS-536
- RS-539
- RS-540
- RS-541
- RS-542
- RS-550
- RS-551
- RS-553
- RS-561
- RS-566
- RS-569
- RS-571
- RS-573
- RS-575
- RS-585
- RS-587
- RS-591
- RS-596
- RS-602
- RS-608
- RS-625
- RS-630
- RS-634
- RS-640
- RS-647
- RS-654
- RS-655
- RS-699
- RS-702
- RS-703
- RS-704
- RS-705
- RS-706
- RS-709
- RS-711
- RS-713
- RS-715
- RS-717
- RS-734
- RS-737
- RS-762
- RS-776
- RS-784
- RS-786

== Secondary Highways ==
- RS-801
- RS-802
- RS-803
- RS-804
- RS-805
- RS-806
- RS-807
- RS-808
- RS-809
- RS-810
- RS-811
- RS-812
- RS-813
- RS-814
- RS-815
- RS-816
- RS-817
- RS-818
- RS-819
- RS-820
- RS-822
- RS-823
- RS-824
- RS-825
- RS-826
- RS-827
- RS-828
- RS-829
- RS-830
- RS-831
- RS-832
- RS-833
- RS-834
- RS-835
- RS-836
- RS-837
- RS-838
- RS-839
- RS-840
- RS-841
- RS-842
- RS-843
- RS-845
- RS-847
- RS-848
- RS-849
- RS-850
- RS-851
- RS-853
- RS-854
- RS-855
- RS-856
- RS-858
- RS-862
- RS-863
- RS-864
- RS-865
- RS-867
- RS-868
- RS-871
- RS-873
- RS-874
- RS-875

== Coincident Highways (RSC) ==
- RSC-287
- RSC-453
- RSC-471
- RSC-472
- RSC-473

== Temporary Highways (RST) ==
- RST-287
- RST-464
- RST-470
- RST-471
- RST-481
- RST-509

== Arroio Dos Ratos Highways (AR) ==
- AR-010

== See also ==
- Rio Grande do Sul
- Brazilian Highway System
- List of highways in Brazil
