= BR-158 (Brazil highway) =

Federal highway of Brazil

BR-158

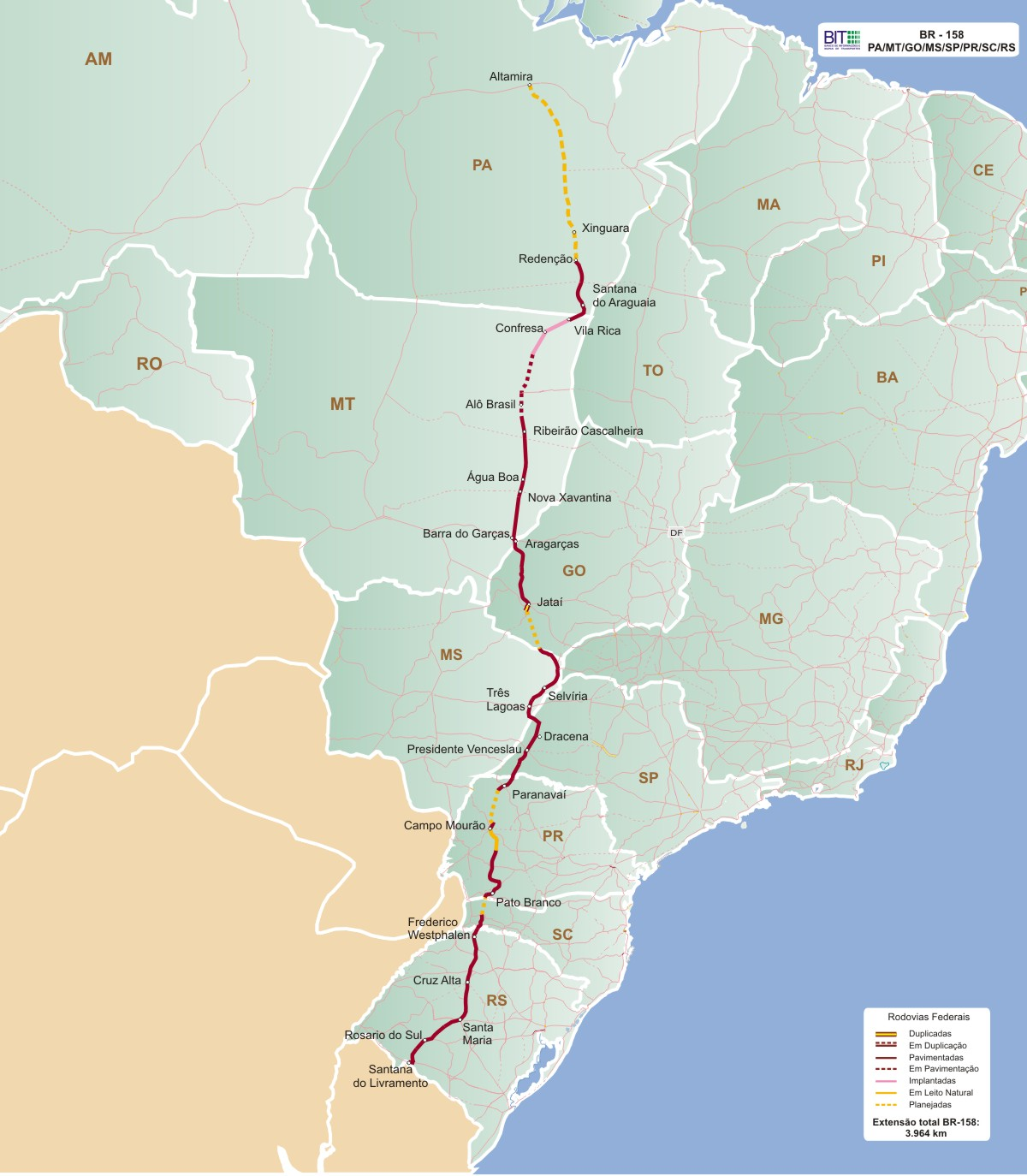

Route information
- Length: 3,955.0 km (2,457.5 mi)

Major junctions
- North end: Altamira, Pará
- South end: Santana do Livramento, Rio Grande do Sul

Location
- Country: Brazil

Highway system
- Highways in Brazil; Federal

BR-158 is a federal highway of Brazil. One of the longest highways in the country, the 3,955.0-kilometre (2,457.5 mi) road connects Altamira, Pará, to Santana do Livramento on the Uruguayan border where it joins Route 5 (Uruguay).

In the original planning of the Ministry of Transportation, its starting point was intended to be located between highways BR-230 and PA-415 in the municipality of Altamira in the state of Pará. However, this link with Altamira was never built; with that, the highway itself only begins in Redenção, in the south of the state. Despite being long, some sections of the highway do not connect with the original route, triggering in several parts "interposed" with other state and federal highways; considering only the officially existing sections, the highway is 2,773 kilometers long.

Unlike most longitudinal highways, it does not cross any Brazilian capital. It is one of the main highways in the interior of Brazil together with BR-163 and BR-364.

The highway is extremely important for states like Mato Grosso, the largest producer of grains in the country (the state is the largest producer of soybeans, corn, and cotton, the third largest producer of beans, and the sixth largest producer of sugar cane in the country), in addition to having the largest herd of cattle in the country, more than 30 million head of cattle, which represents almost 14% of the national production alone. The paving and maintenance of the highway, which still has tracts of land, is considered an important factor in economic development, which interferes with transportation costs and the price of goods that reach the final consumer. The Araguaia Valley, where the road passes, is an important pole of the state's development. In 2005, the former Secretary of Infrastructure of Brazil, Luiz Antônio Pagot, mentioned that "the BR-158 is a structuring and multimodal axis that combines the highway with the waterway and the railroad, which is why it is of great importance." Also according to him, "the completion of the paving works on BR-158 will give competitiveness not only to agribusiness in the state of Mato Grosso, but will also make it possible for the port of Ponta da Madeira to be an export corridor for others. products that can be incorporated It will also create opportunities to return cargo from the northeast. Ships coming from abroad can bring agricultural inputs and other products. BR-158 will connect with two main railways: the Carajás, which runs from the Carajás depots. (in Pará)) to the Ponta de Madeira terminal in São Luiz (Maranhão), and the Norte-Sul railway, which is currently located in Estreito, Tocantins, and has been moving to the state of Goiás.

For the state of Pará, the highway is also of vital importance. It passes through the great mining region of the state, in the Serra dos Carajás area. Considering only the first half of 2017 (mid-year), Pará's mineral production was led by iron ore (77.5 million tons). Bauxite ranks second, with 16 million tons. In third place, manganese, with 1 million tons; fourth, kaolin with 662 thousand tons; then copper with 424 thousand tons, limestone with 335 thousand tons, nickel with 42 thousand tons and gold with 1.6 thousand tons. In terms of commercialized value, iron produced almost R $ 13 billion, copper R $ 2.7 billion, bauxite R $ 1.4 billion, nickel R $ 345 million, manganese R $ 302 million, kaolin R $ 289 million, gold R $ 150 million and limestone R $ 12 million, for a total of R $ 18.1 billion. China represents 48.8% of Pará's exports, followed by Malaysia with 7.3%. Exports to China and Malaysia are predominantly iron ore, 93.1% and 97.0%, respectively. In 2016, substances of the metallic class represented around 77% of the total value of commercialized mineral production in Brazil. Among these substances, eight correspond to 98.6% of the value: aluminum, copper, tin, iron, manganese, niobium, nickel, and gold. The expressive participation of iron in this quantity stands out, whose production is mainly concentrated in the states of Minas Gerais and Pará. The country's iron ore production was 410 million tons in 2019. Brazil is the world's second largest iron ore exporter and has the second position in the ranking of reserves: under Brazilian soil there are at least 29 billion tons . The largest reserves are currently in the states of Minas Gerais and Pará.

The highway is also of great economic and logistical importance for southern Brazil, as it passes through high production areas in Rio Grande do Sul, Santa Catarina and Paraná. Rio Grande do Sul is the largest rice producer in the country, with 70.5% of Brazil's production, and Santa Catarina is the second largest national producer. In soybeans, Paraná and Rio Grande do Sul are among the largest producers in the country, with around 16% of the national production for each one, only surpassed by Mato Grosso. Paraná is the second largest corn producer in the country, and the third largest is Rio Grande do Sul. It also runs through large areas of pork production, where the 3 southern states are the largest producers in the country. Santa Catarina is the largest producer in Brazil. The State is responsible for 28.38% of the country's slaughter and 40.28% of Brazilian exports of pork. Paraná, on the other hand, has a breeding population of 667 thousand housed dwellings, with a herd representing 17.85% of the Brazilian total. Paraná occupies the second position in the country's productive ranking, with 21.01%, and the third place among exporting states, with 14.22%. In the 3rd place in Brazil comes Rio Grande do Sul, with almost 15% participation. The western region of Paraná is today the main pole for transforming grains into animal protein in the country. In addition, the southern region occupies the first place in the ranking of Brazilian milk production. The South has 35.7% of the Brazilian milk production, Paraná is already the second largest national producer with 4,700 million liters. It also passes through the sugar cane producing region of Paraná, which, in 2017, was the fifth largest cane producer, the third largest sugar producer and the fifth largest alcohol producer in the country. This year it harvested about 46 million tons of cane. The state sugar and alcohol sector has 25 plants and employs about 55,000 people. The regions of Umuarama, Paranavaí, Maringá and Jacarezinho concentrate production. Brazil is the world's largest producer, with 672.8 million tons harvested in 2018.

== Gallery ==
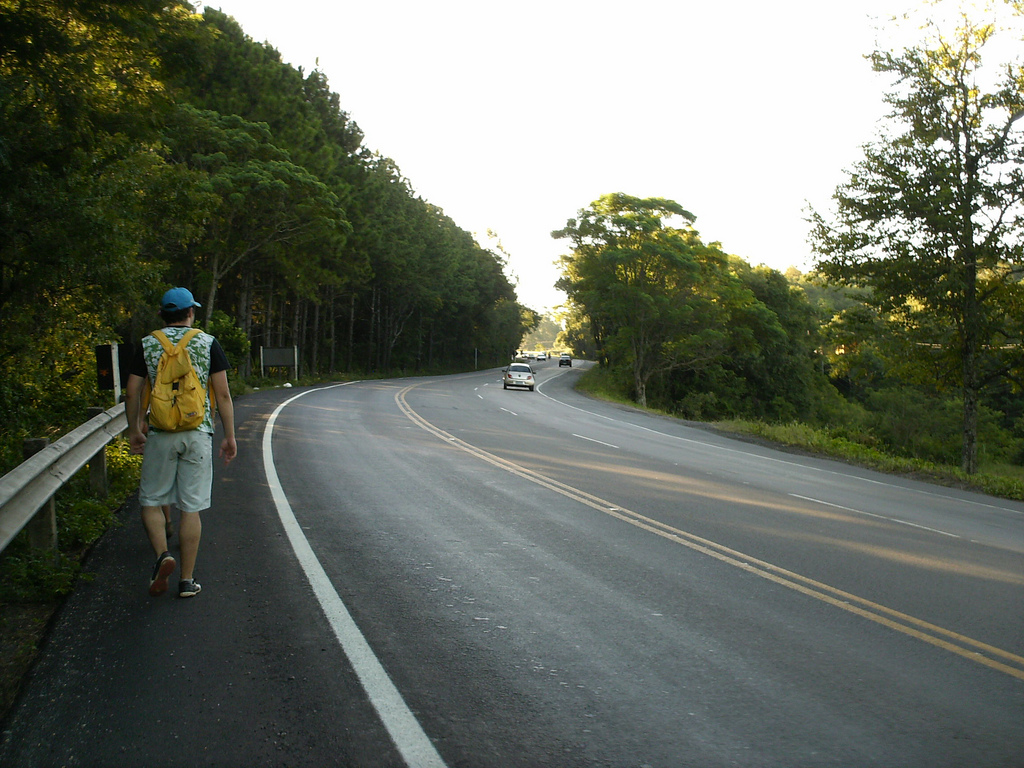
BR-158 in Santa Maria, Rio Grande do Sul

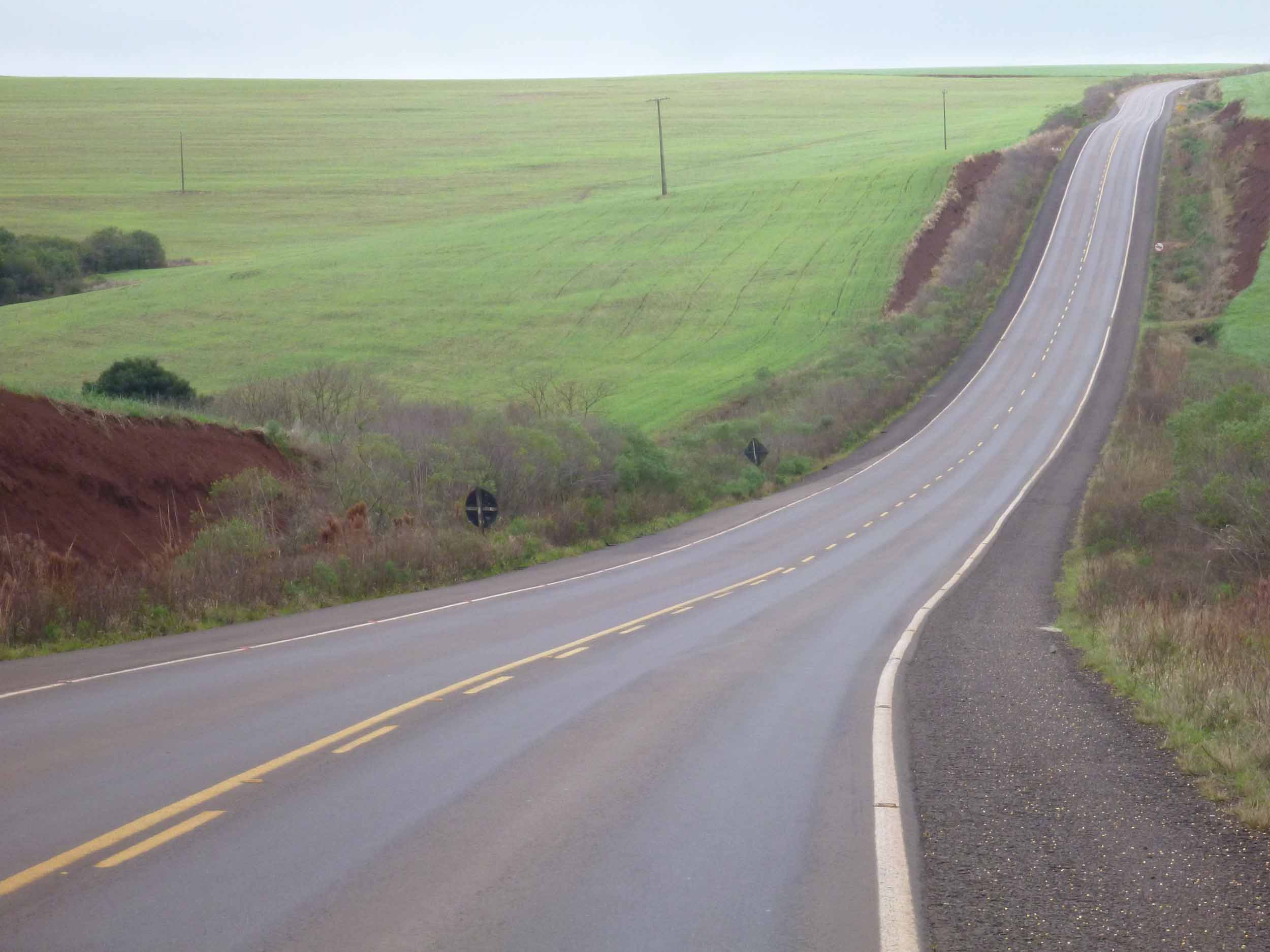
BR-158 in Rio Grande do Sul

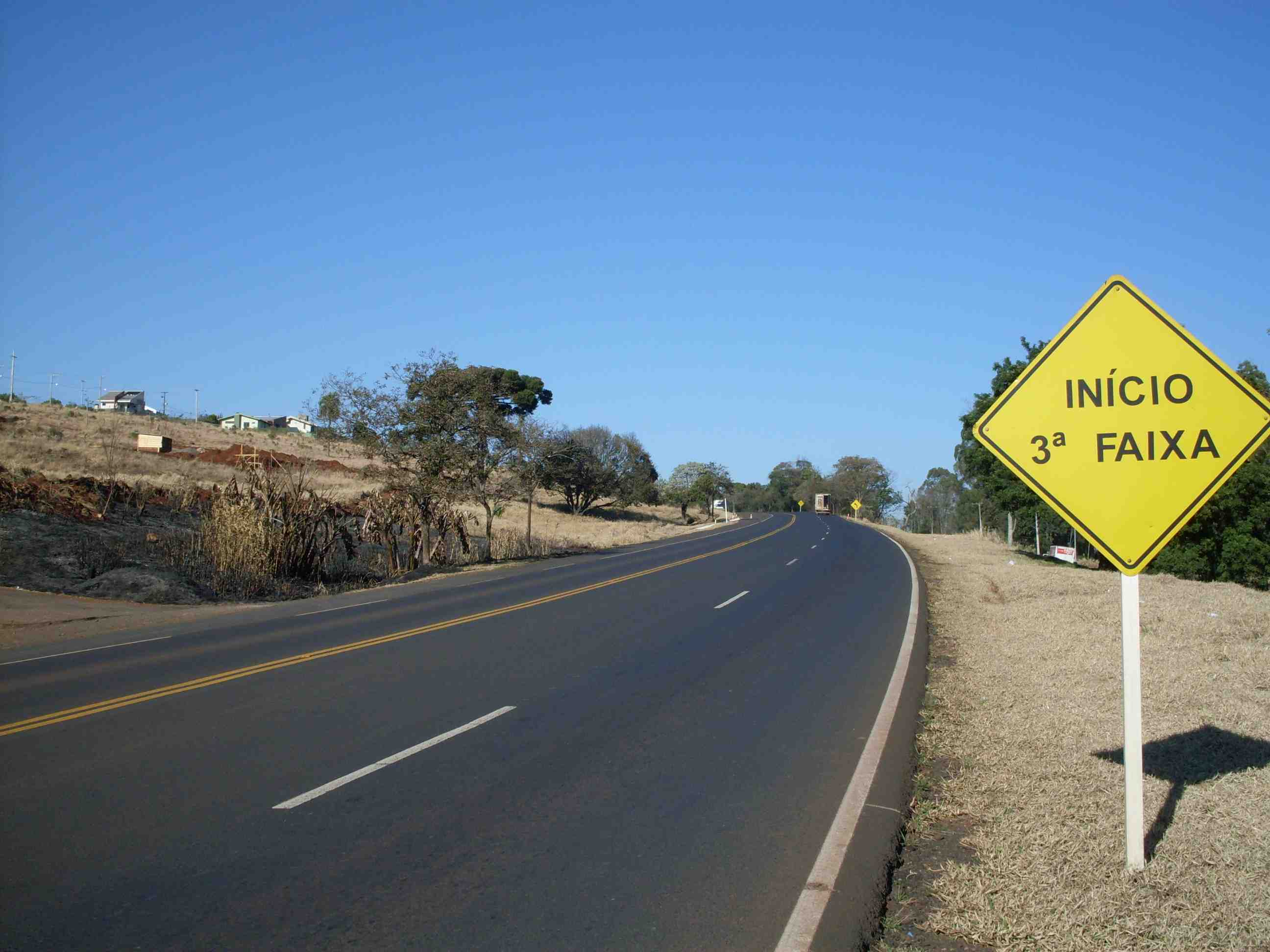
BR-158 in Paraná

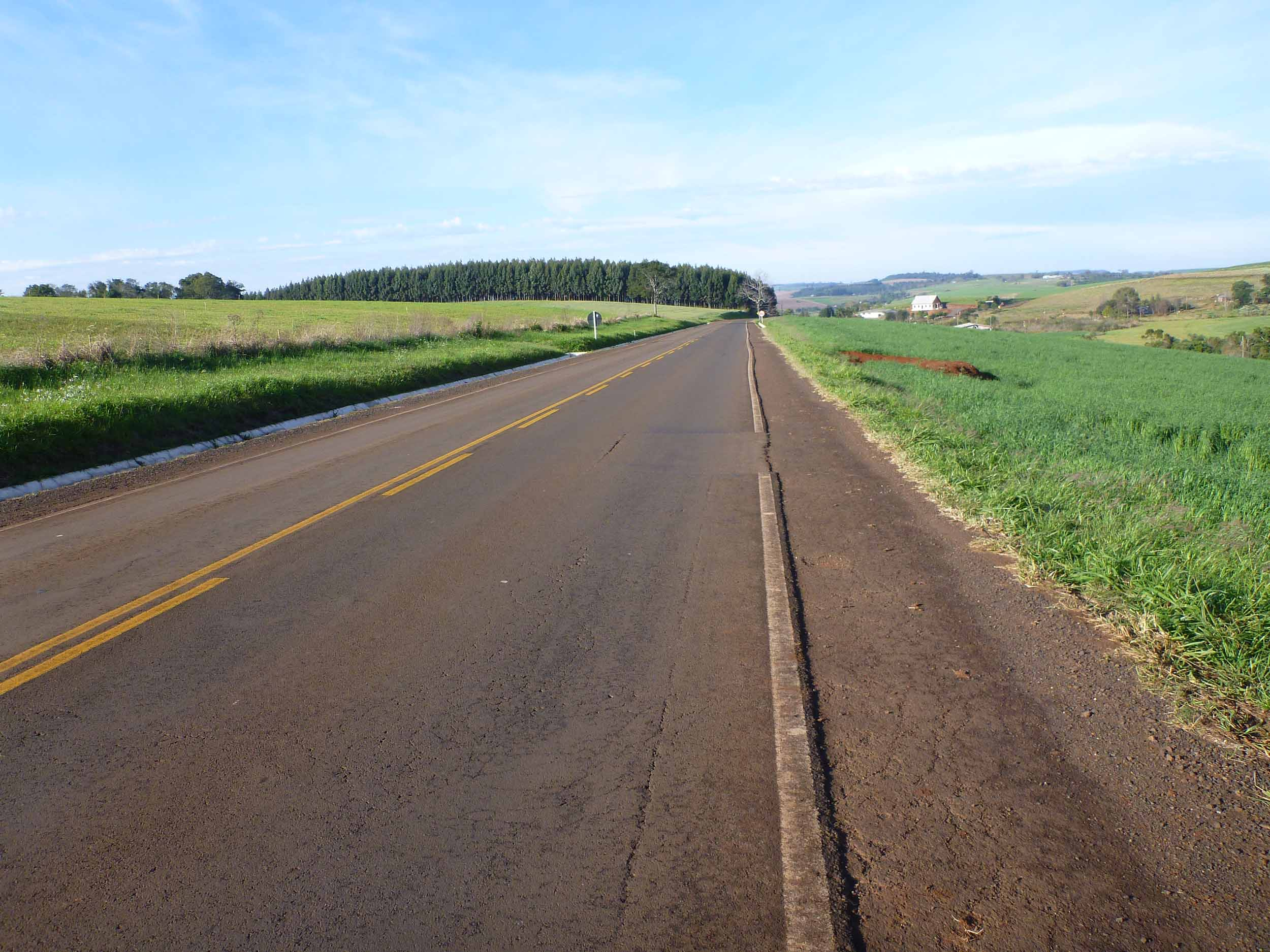
BR-158 in Paraná

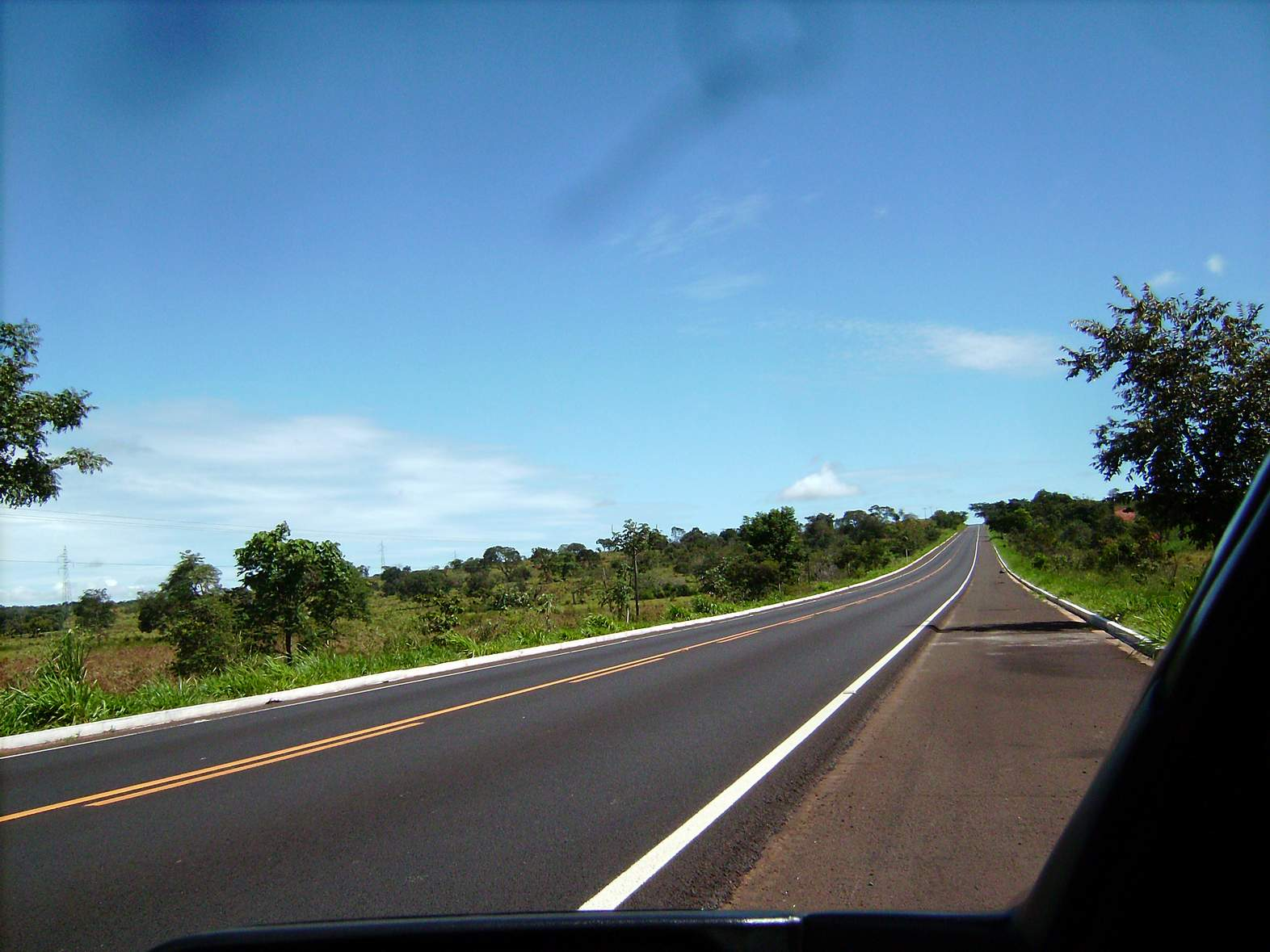
BR-158 in Paranaíba, Mato Grosso do Sul
