= Immediate Geographic Region of Muriaé =

Urban administrative region in Minas Gerais, Brazil

Immediate Geographic Region of Muriaé, in the state of Minas Gerais, Brazil.

The Immediate Geographic Region of Muriaé is one of the 10 immediate geographic regions in the Intermediate Geographic Region of Juiz de Fora, one of the 70 immediate geographic regions in the Brazilian state of Minas Gerais and one of the 509 of Brazil, created by the National Institute of Geography and Statistics (IBGE) in 2017.

== Municipalities ==
It comprises 12 municipalities.

- Antônio Prado de Minas
- Barão de Monte Alto
- Eugenópolis
- Fervedouro
- Miradouro
- Miraí
- Muriaé
- Patrocínio do Muriaé
- Rosário da Limeira
- São Francisco do Glória
- São Sebastião da Vargem Alegre
- Vieiras
