= BR-116 (Brazil highway) =

Highway in Brazil

BR-116

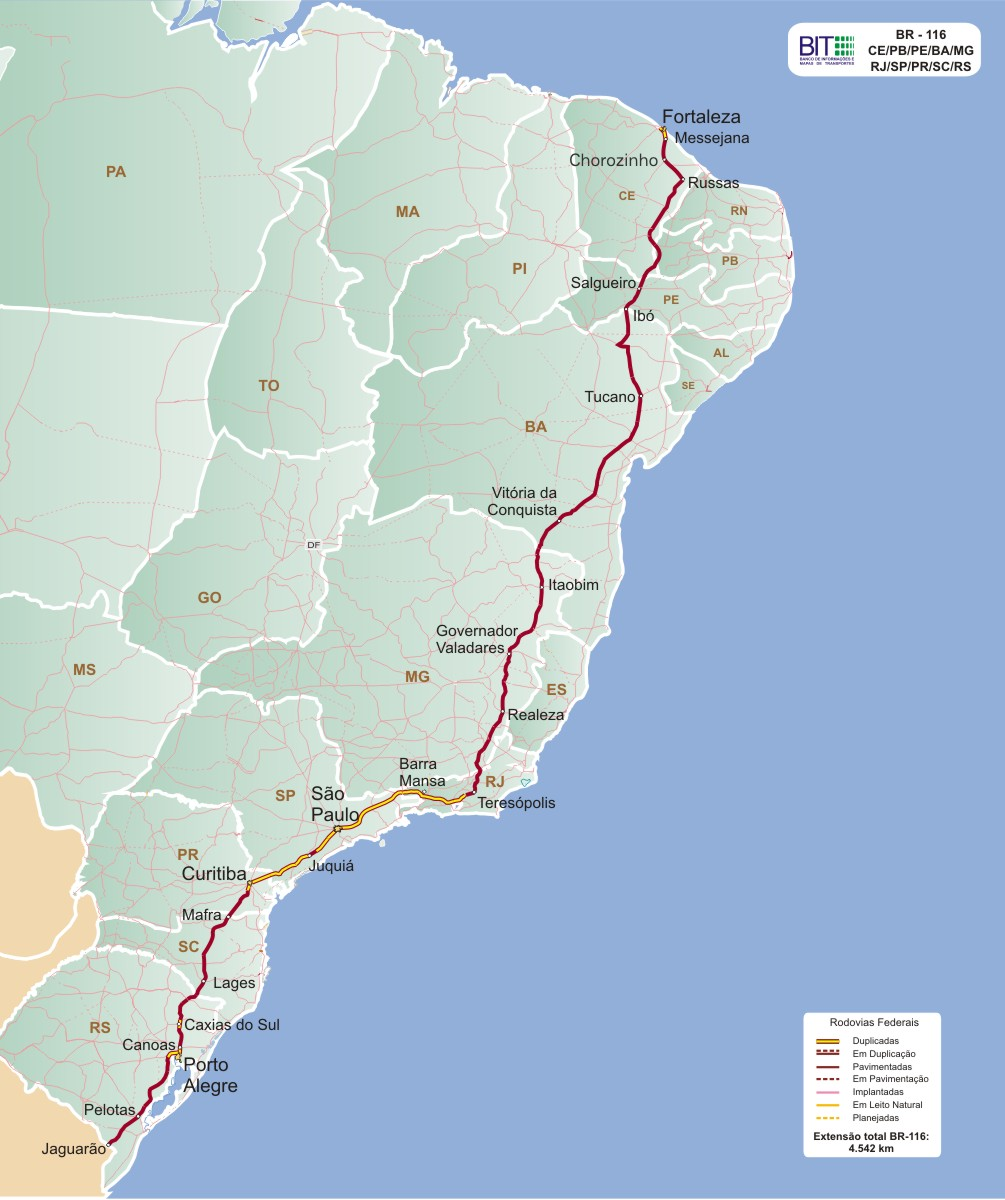

Route information
- Length: 4,542 km (2,822 mi)
- Existed: 1951 (Rio-São Paulo); 1948 (Rio-Fortaleza); 1967-1977 (divided highways of Rodovia Presidente Dutra and Rodovia Régis Bittencourt)–present

Major junctions
- North end: Manuel Dias Branco Plaza, Fortaleza, Ceará
- CE-356 in Russas, CE; BR-404 in Icó, CE; BR-232 in Salgueiro, PE; BR-324 in Feira de Santana, BA; BA-262 in Vitória da Conquista, BA; BR-259 in Governador Valadares, MG; BR-495 in Teresópolis, RJ; BR-101 in Rio de Janeiro, RJ; SP-15 in São Paulo, SP; BR-277 in Curitiba, PR; BR-280 in Mafra, SC; BR-282 in Lages, SC; BR-453 in Caxias do Sul, RS; BR-290 in Porto Alegre, RS; BR-392 in Pelotas, RS
- South end: Jaguarão, Rio Grande do Sul

Location
- Country: Brazil

Highway system
- Highways in Brazil; Federal

The BR-116 is part of the Brazilian Highway System. With a total length of 4,542 km (2,822 mi) it is the longest highway in the country. It is also the longest highway in the country to be completely paved.

The highway connects Fortaleza, Ceará, one of the largest Northeast Brazil metropolises, to the southern city of Jaguarão, Rio Grande do Sul, on the border with Uruguay.

It is considered one of the most important, and busiest, highways in the country, along with BR-101.

== Route description ==
The BR-116 runs in a north-south direction, parallel to, but not on Brazil's coastline. It connects major urban centers, including Fortaleza, São Paulo, Rio de Janeiro, Curitiba and Porto Alegre.

Numerous stretches of the BR-116 highway have other official names.

The highway is especially busy along the section connecting Curitiba—São Paulo—Rio de Janeiro (via Teresópolis). The Curitiba–São Paulo section–officially known as the Régis Bittencourt Highway (Rodovia Régis Bittencourt)–is nicknamed the "Highway of Death" ("Rodovia da Morte") due to its many weather-related accidents. The São Paulo—Rio de Janeiro section is officially named President Dutra Highway (Rodovia Presidente Dutra) and is the busiest section of the BR-116, running into or close to 15 cities with over 200,000 inhabitants. The section between Novo Hamburgo and Porto Alegre is also heavily used, and there is a high volume of freight traffic between Porto Alegre and the Port of Rio Grande, in Pelotas.

Major cities directly served by the BR-116 are: Fortaleza, Chorozinho, Russas, Tucano, Itaobim, Governador Valadares, Realeza, Teresópolis, Rio de Janeiro, Barra Mansa, São Paulo, Juquiá, Curitiba, Mafra, Lages, Caxias do Sul, Pelotas, and Jaguarão.

== Dual carriageway ==
In the Southeast Region of the country, the highway is a dual carriageway for 850 km between Curitiba in the south and Guapimirim in the north. This dual carriageway begins south of São Paulo and ends north of Rio de Janeiro thus connecting the two largest cities in Brazil. Between Curitiba and São Paulo its official name is Rodovia Régis Bittencourt. Between São Paulo and Rio de Janeiro its official name is Rodovia Presidente Dutra.

The highway is a dual carriageway for the 70 km between Guaíba and Novo Hamburgo.

In November 2022, 148 km of the planned 211 km between Guaíba and Pelotas had been converted to a dual carriageway, with work continuing on the remaining portion.

Between Curitiba and Mandirituba, in the state of Santa Catarina, it is a dual carriageway.

In the Northeast Region of the country, the highway is a dual carriageway for the 76 km between Feira de Santana and Argoim.

There is some dual carriageway near Fortaleza, Ceará.

== Privatization ==
On 1 March 1996, the stretch of highway between the cities of São Paulo and Rio de Janeiro, known as the Rodovia Presidente Dutra, was granted to private companies, with the CCR Nova Dutra company being the current administrator. On the same day, a 144 kilometer section between the cities of Duque de Caxias and Sapucaia was granted to a company named CRT.

== Gallery ==
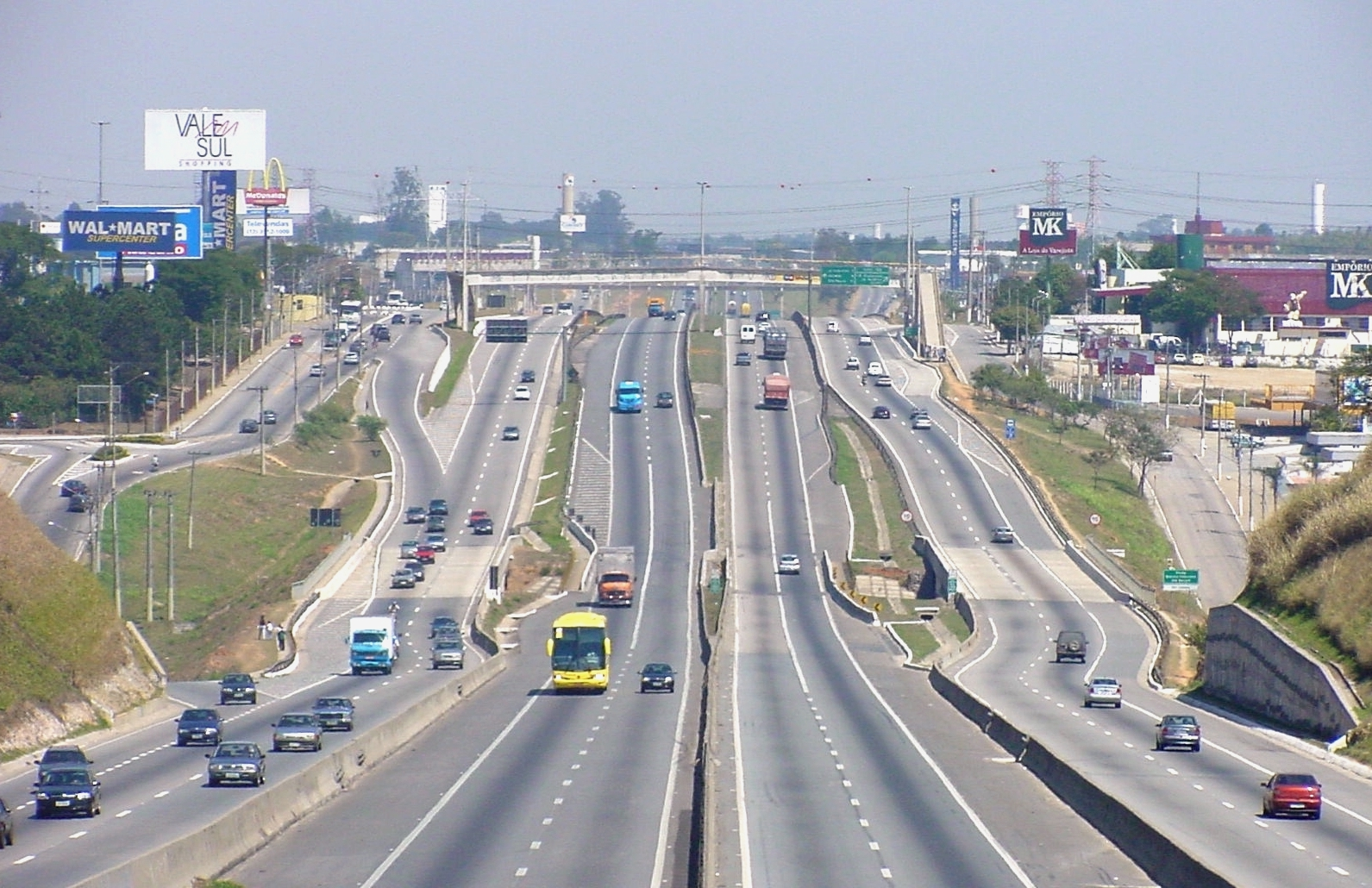
BR-116 in São José dos Campos, São Paulo

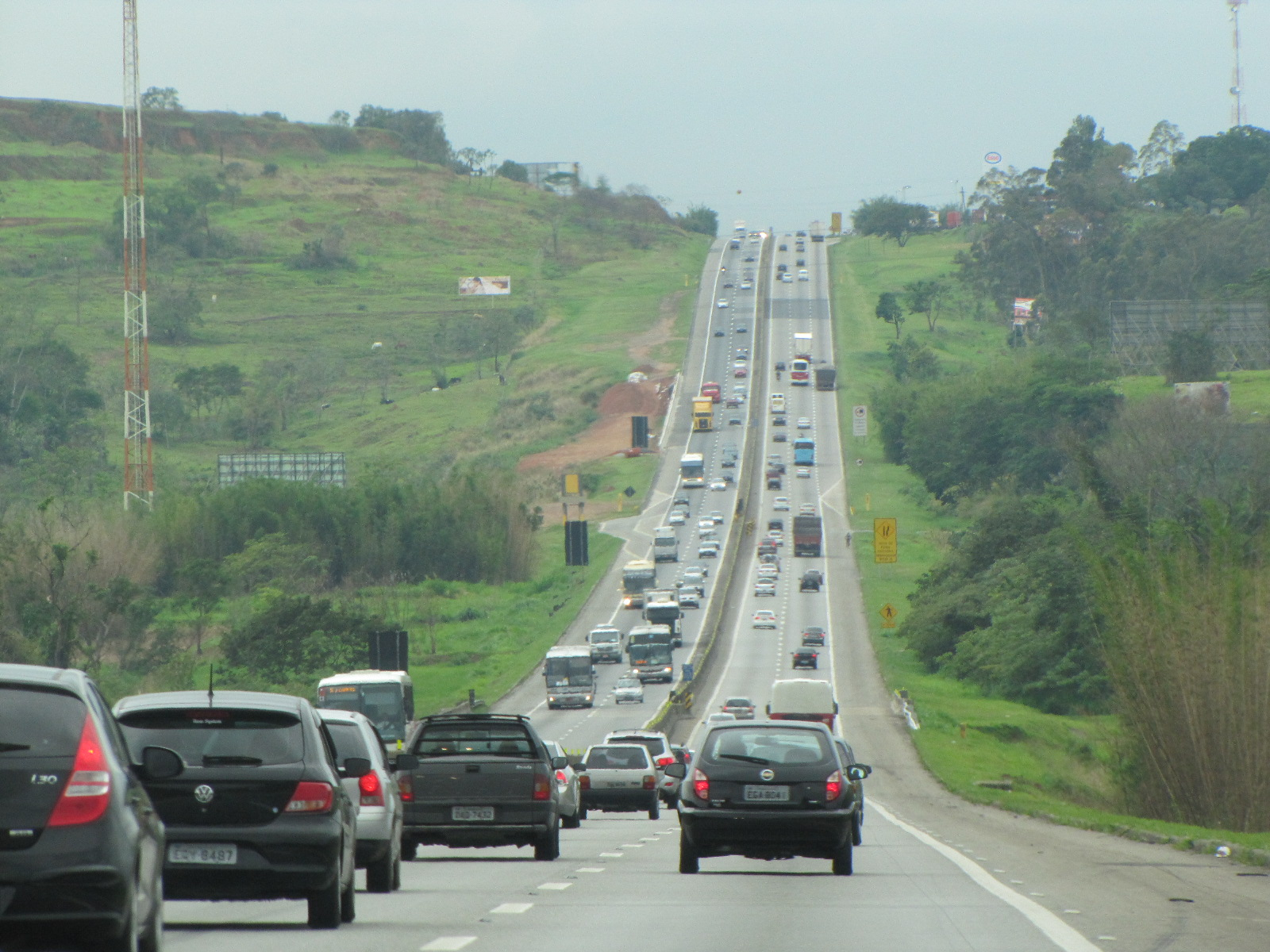
Rodovia Presidente Dutra in São Paulo

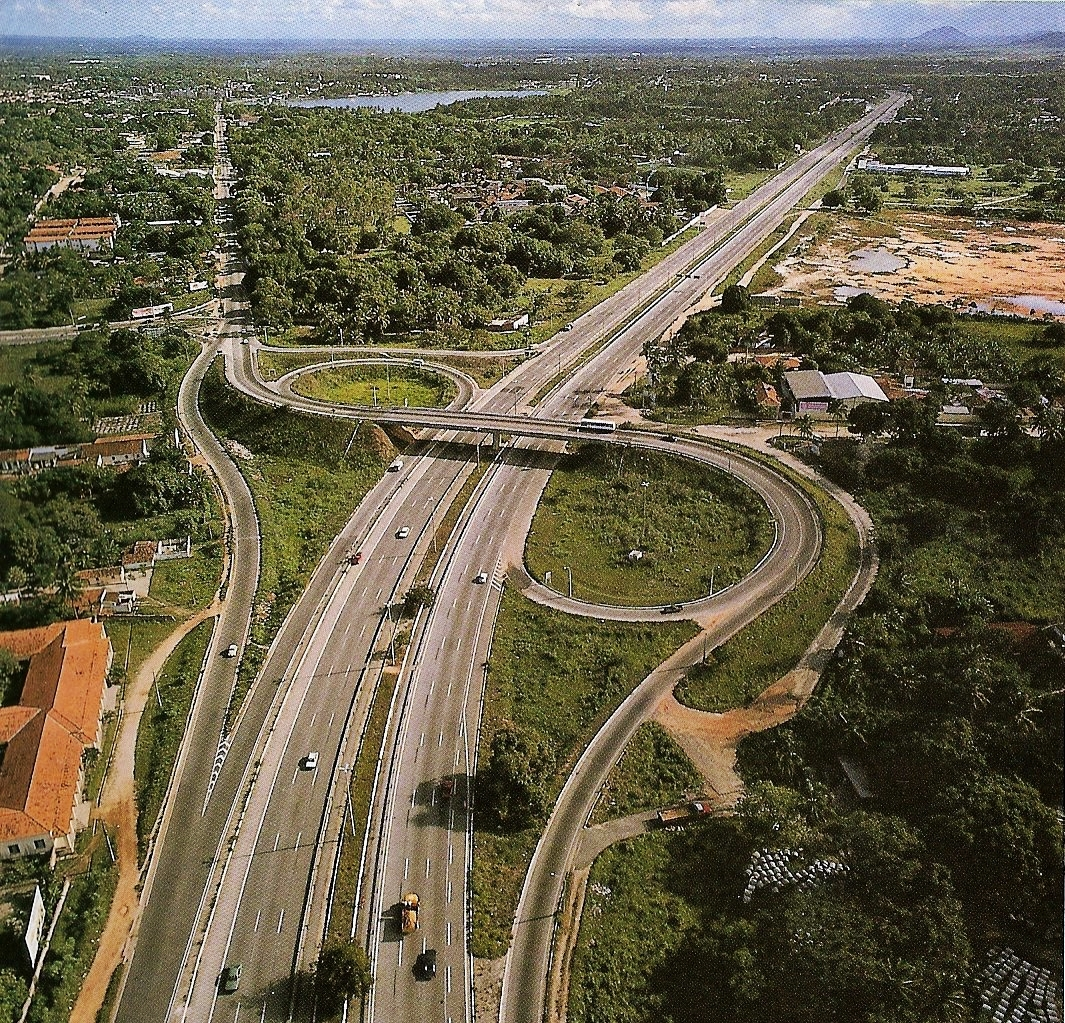
BR-116 in Fortaleza, Ceará

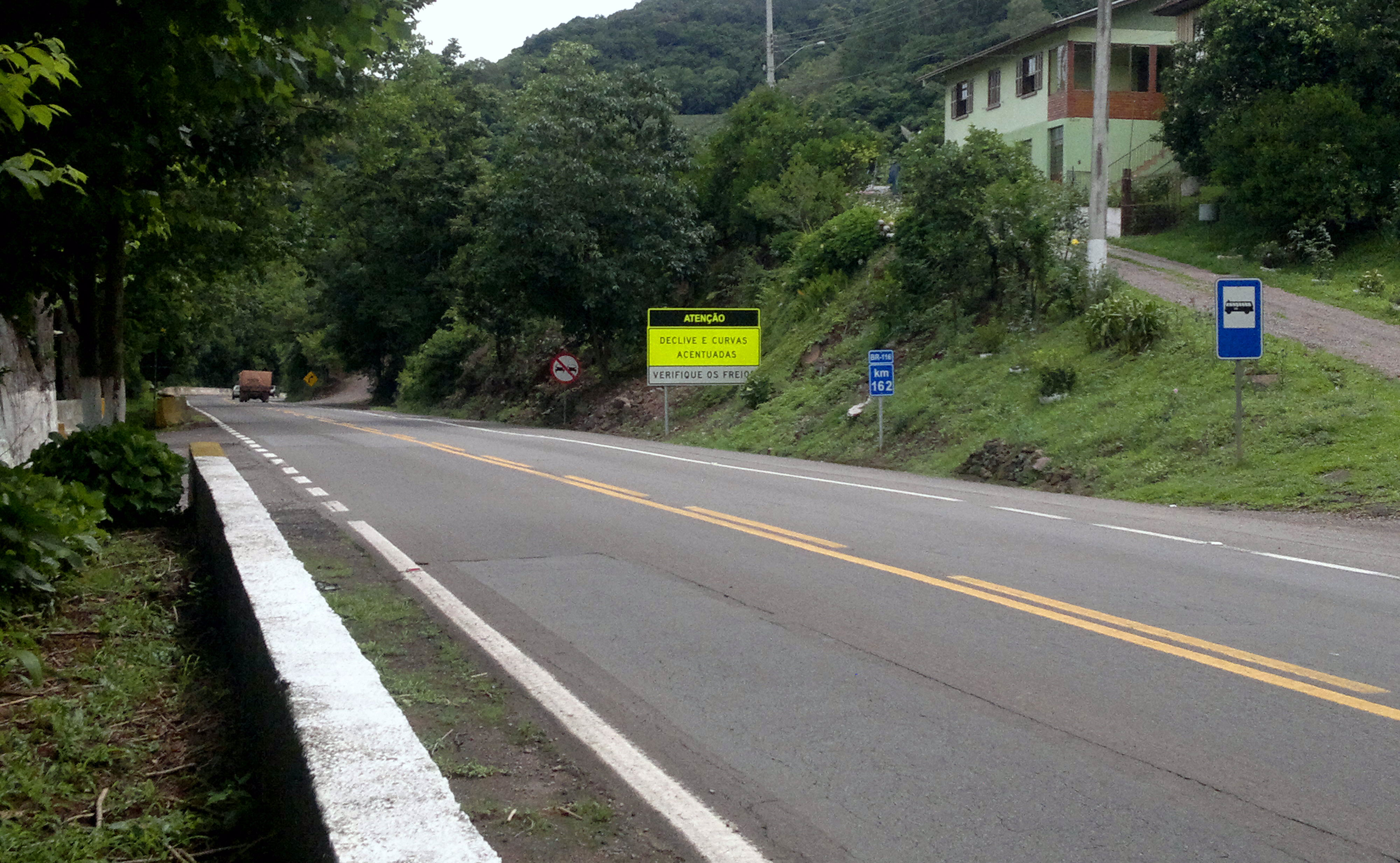
BR-116 in Mirante, Bahia

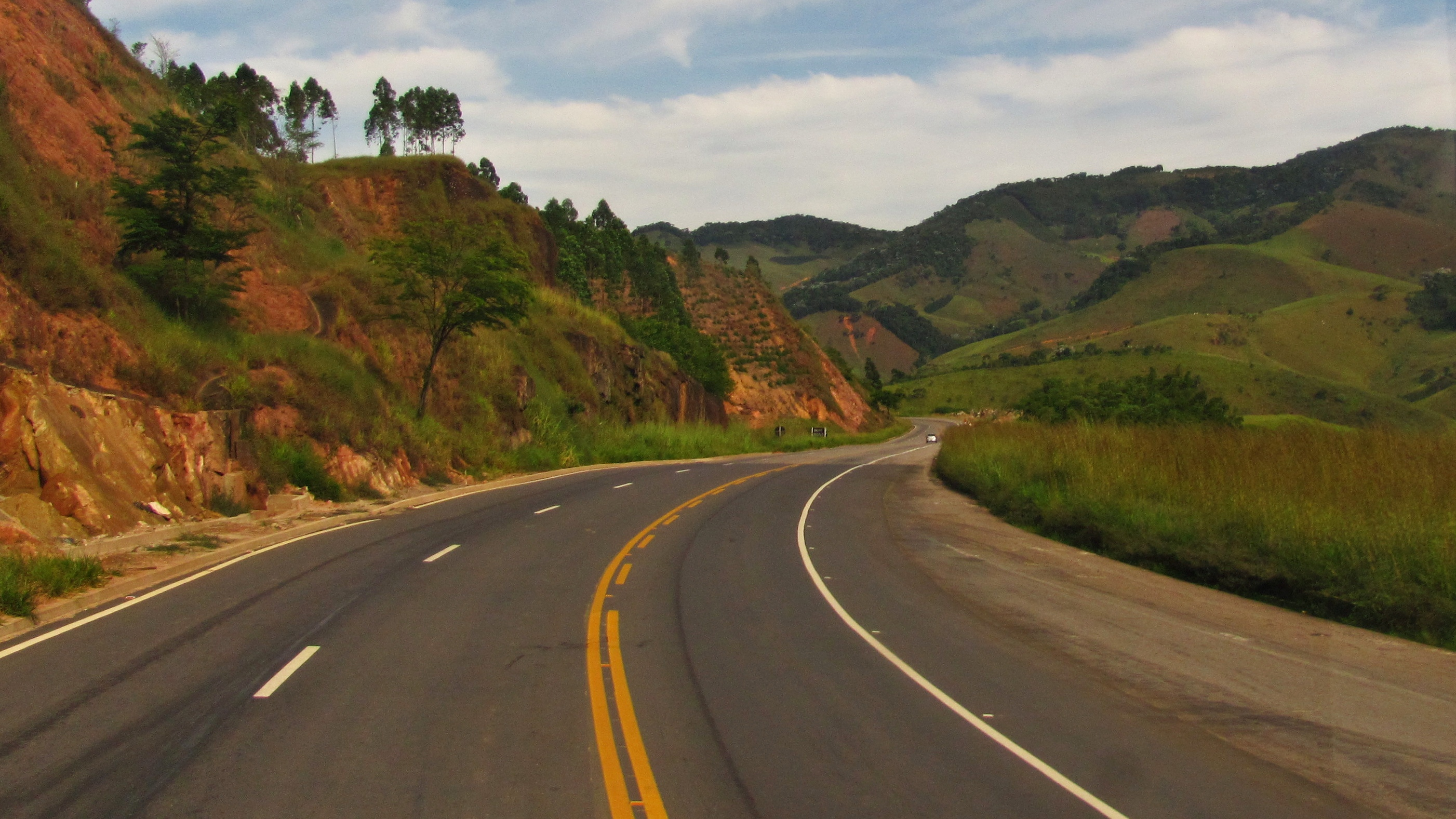
BR-116 in Miradouro, Minas Gerais

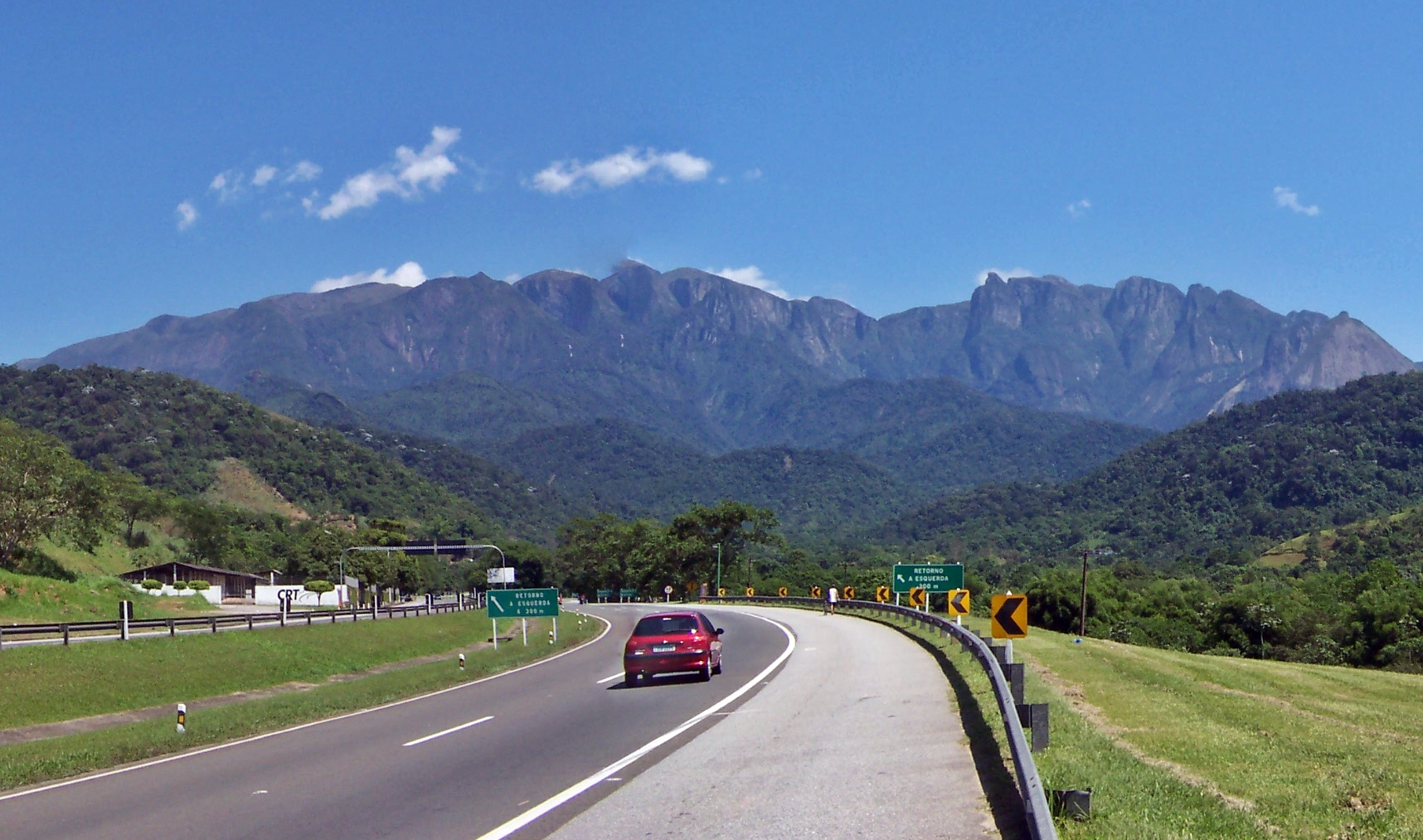
BR-116 in Guapimirim, Rio de Janeiro

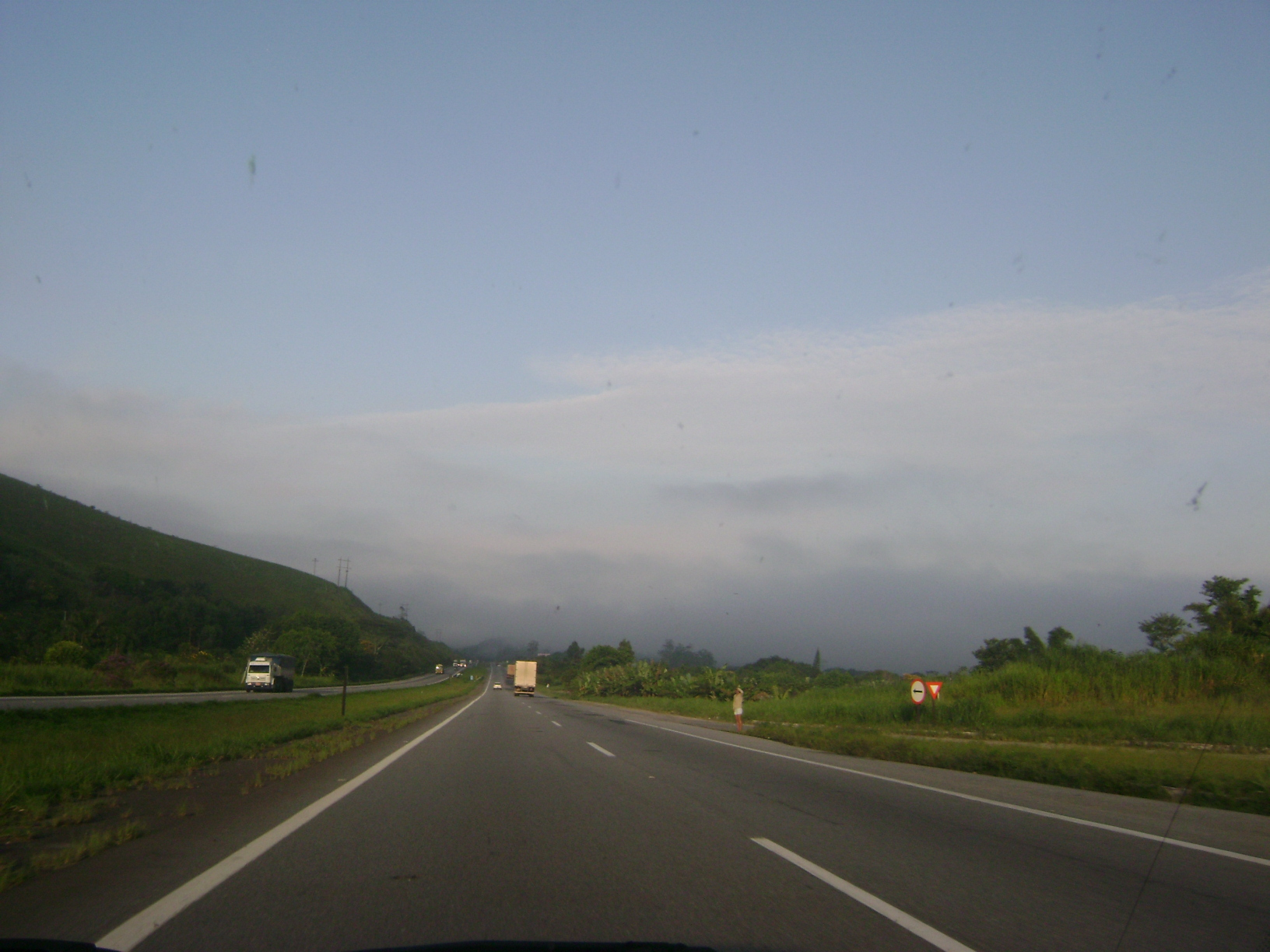
BR-116 in Registro, São Paulo

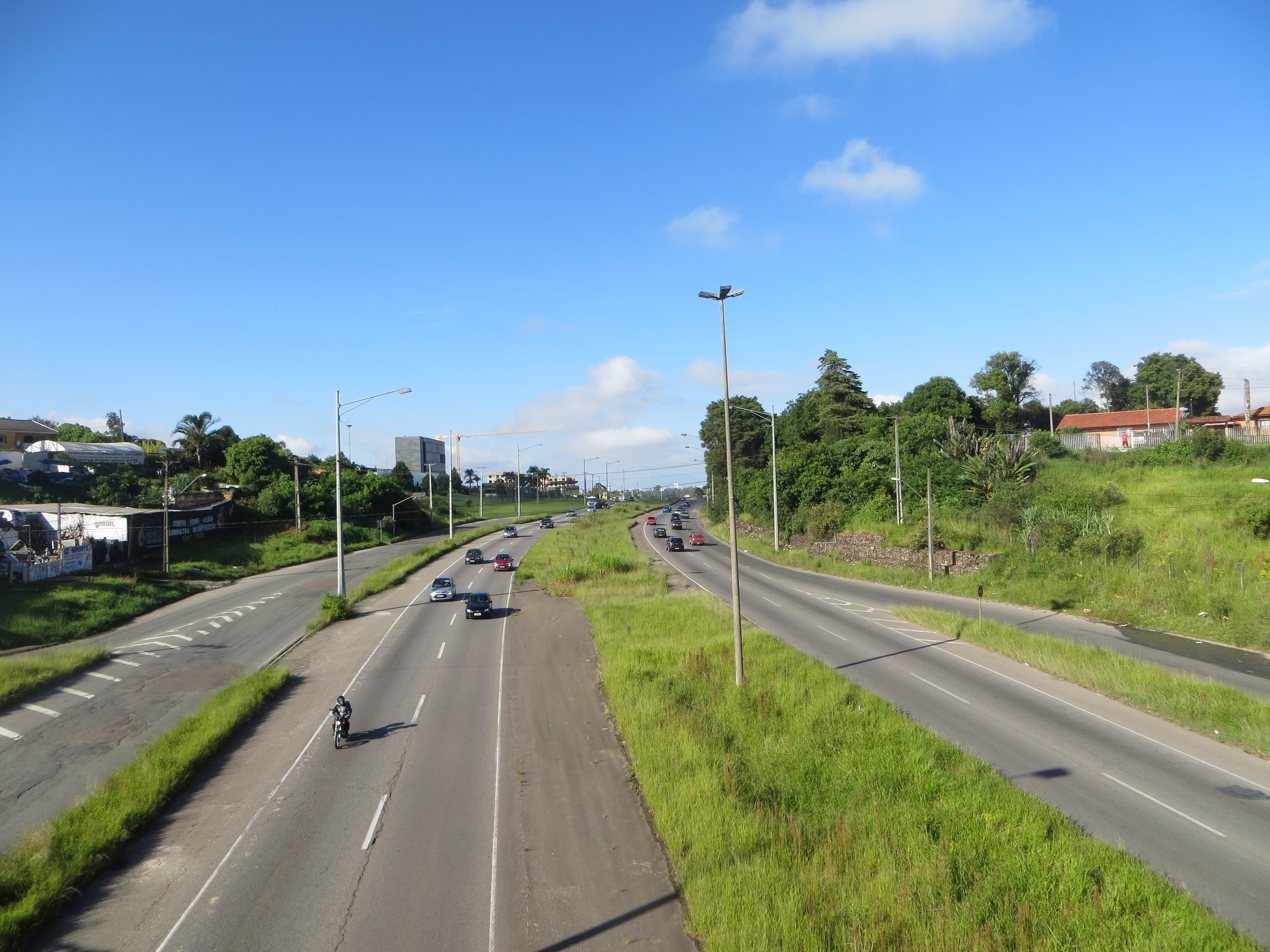
BR-116 in Curitiba, Paraná

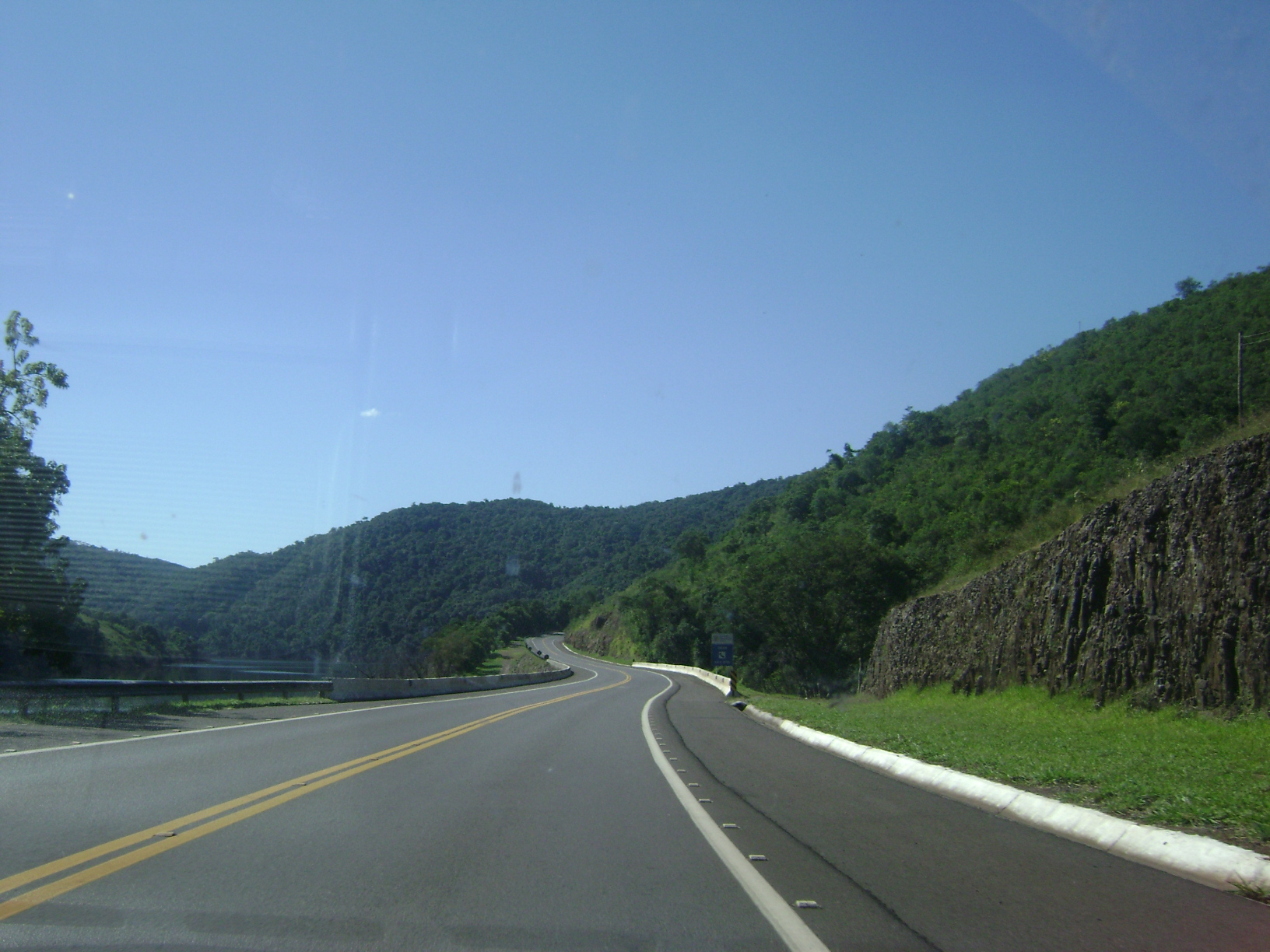
BR-116 in Santa Catarina

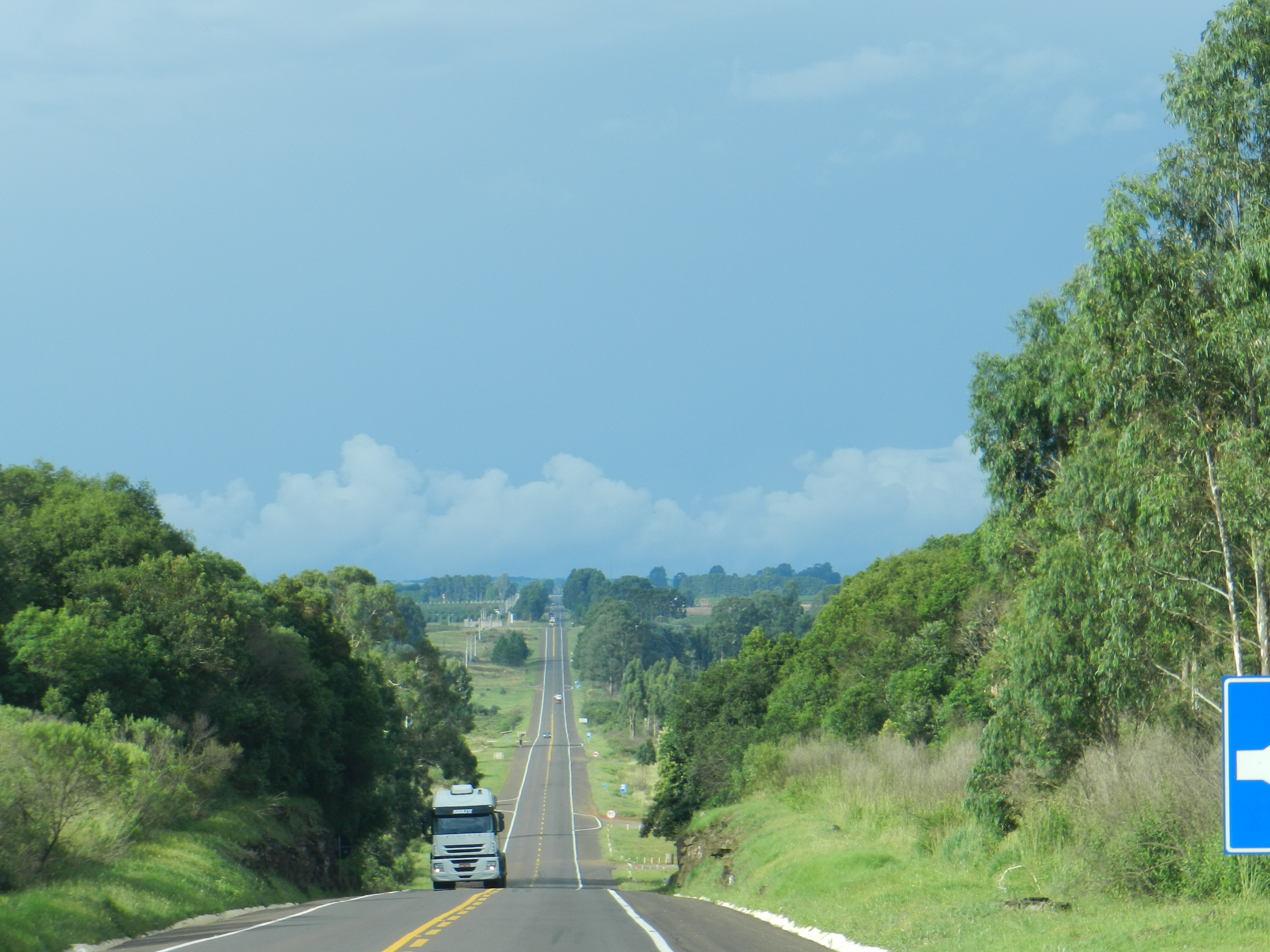
BR-116 in Vacaria, Rio Grande do Sul

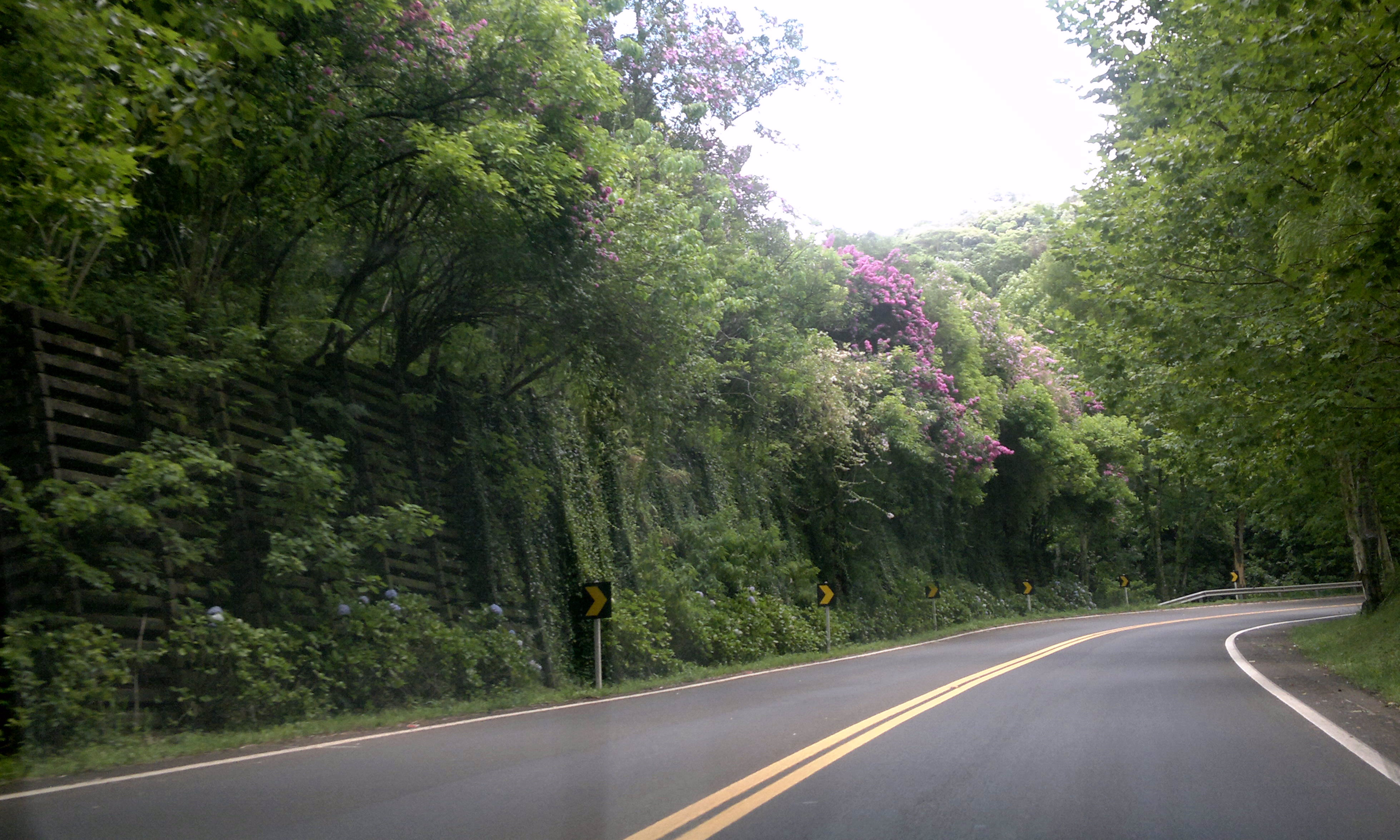
BR-116 in Morro Reuter, Rio Grande do Sul

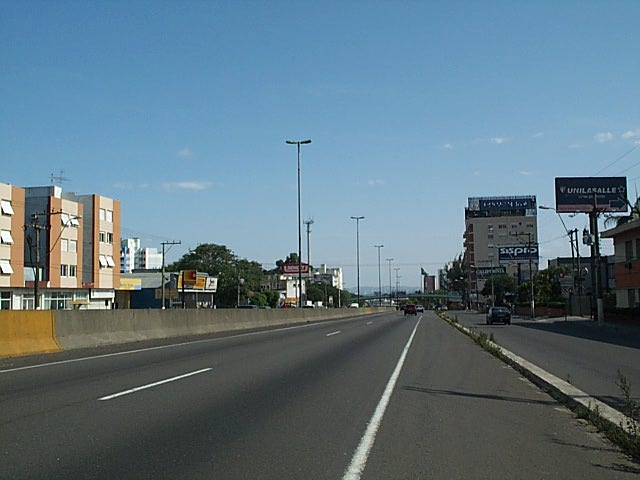
BR-116 in Canoas, Rio Grande do Sul

== See also ==
- BR-101
