= Paulo Krauss =

Brazilian footballer

Personal information
- Full name: Paulo de Oliveira Krauss
- Date of birth: 14 April 1984 (age 42)
- Place of birth: Fervedouro, Brazil
- Position: Forward

Youth career
- –2005: São Paulo

Senior career*
Years	Team	Apps	(Gls)
2003–2006	São Paulo	2	(0)
2004	→ Fortaleza (loan)		
2005	→ América-SP (loan)		
2005	→ Ferroviária (loan)		
2006	→ Atlético Mogi (loan)		
2006	→ Náutico (loan)		
2007	Guanabara-RJ		
2008	Cabofriense		
2008	Monte Azul		
2008	Tigres do Brasil		
2009–2010	Votoraty		
2011	Itapirense		
2011	Rio Branco-AC		
2011	Marília		
2012	Atlético Sorocaba		
2012	CSA		
2012–2013	Ypiranga-PE		
2014	Itapirense		
2014	Inter de Limeira		
2017	Altos		
- * Club domestic league appearances and goals as of 27 September 2023

Paulo de Oliveira Krauss (born 14 April 1984), better known as Paulo Krauss, is a Brazilian former professional footballer who played as a forward.

== Career ==
He emerged as a standout in the youth categories of São Paulo FC, but did not establish himself and was loaned to several other clubs. It was highlighted in Votoraty by Fernando Diniz, and later played for several other clubs in Brazil.

== Honours ==
Votoraty

- Campeonato Paulista Série A3: 2009
- Copa Paulista: 2009

Rio Branco

- Campeonato Acreano: 2011

Altos

- Campeonato Piauiense: 2017
