= Muriaé =

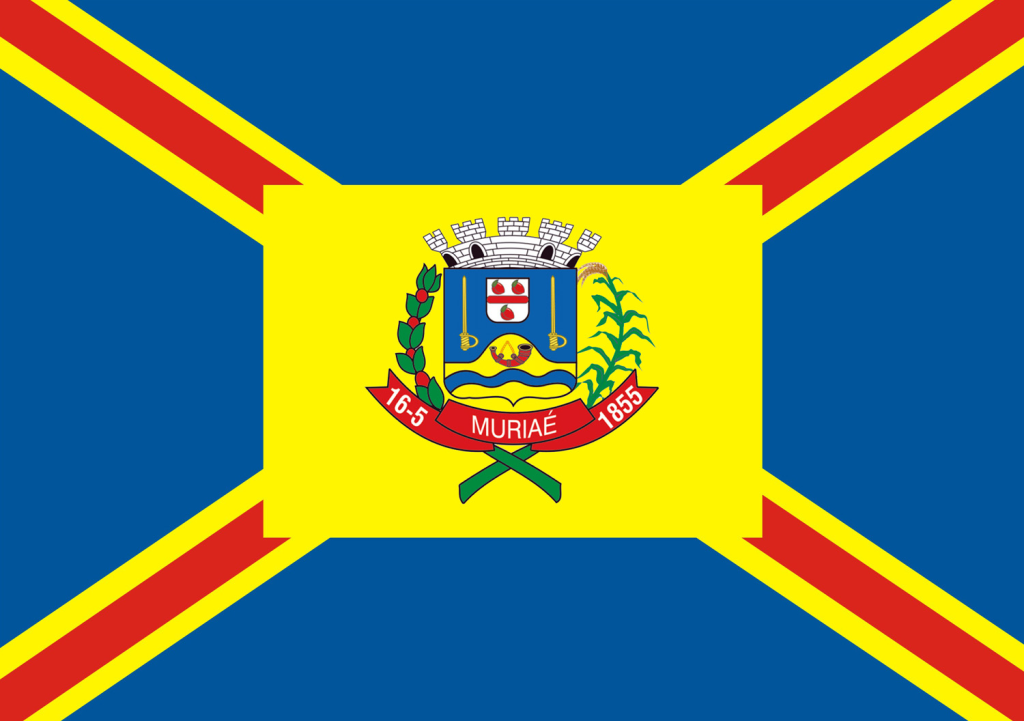
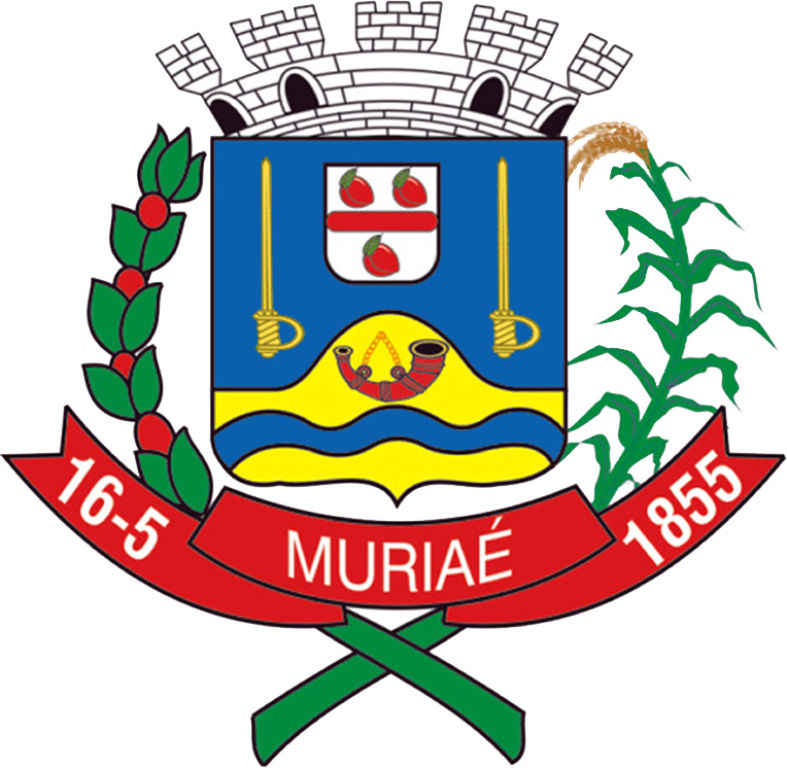
- Flag Coat of arms

- Muriaé within Minas Gerais

- Location of Muriaé
- Coordinates: 21°07′50″S 42°21′59″W

Government
  - Mayor: Marcos Guarino (PSB)

Area
  - Total: 843.327 km^{2} (325.610 sq mi)

Population (2022 Census)
  - Total: 104,108
  - Estimate (2025): 108,447
  - Density: 123.449/km^{2} (319.732/sq mi)
- Demonym: muriaense
- Time zone: UTC−3 (BRT)
- Postal Code: 36880-000
- Area code: +55 32
- Website: City Hall of Muriaé

Muriaé is a municipality in southeast Minas Gerais state, Brazil. It is located in the Zona da Mata region and its population in 2022 Census (IBGE) was approximately 104,108 inhabitants.

== Important Facts ==
- Municipal Limits

Ervália, Santana de Cataguases, Laranjal, Palma, Miraí, São Sebastião da Vargem Alegre, Rosário da Limeira, Miradouro, Vieiras, Eugenópolis, Patrocínio do Muriaé and Barão de Monte Alto.

- Economy

Industry, agriculture (coconut and coffee), services, and cattle raising

- Average annual temperature – 26 °C
- Elevation – 209 m
- Area – 843,9 km²
- Distance from Belo Horizonte – 363 km

It is located at the junction of two major highways, BR-116 (Rio-Bahia) and BR-393. Its name means "to have the taste of sweet sugarcane" in the indigenous language.

== Muriaé River ==
The Muriaé River passes through the city. It is a river whose source is in the Serra das Perobas in Minas Gerais near the boundary with the state of Rio de Janeiro. It flows in a west–east direction and joins the Paraíba do Sul River, a little above the city of Campos dos Goytacazes. Its waters are muddy and cold and they supply several municipalities for drinking and irrigation. There are some waterfalls, the most important being the Cachoeira da Fumaça, in Retiro do Muriaé. Its length is about 300 km, of which 40 are navigable for small boats. It is flanked along all its course by highway BR 356 and the Leopoldina Railway.

== History ==
In 1817, Constantino José Pinto, with 40 men, a seller of herbs and medicinal roots, came down the Pomba River and reached Muriaé, where he stopped, building a hut near the waterfalls on the river.

In 1819 the Frenchman Guido Tomáz Marliére arrived and built a chapel. In 1841 the district was created with the name of São Paulo do Muriahé. In 1855 this was elevated to the category of "vila" (village) with the same name. Finally in 1865 the comarca was created and the village became the city of Muriahé.

In 1923 Muriahé became Muriaé out of spelling considerations. The progress of the new settlement was constant, especially after 1886 with the inauguration of the train station on the Leopoldina railroad line.

In 1910 electricity came to the city, in 1911 the first water and sewage, and in 1913 the first urban telephone.

== Geography ==
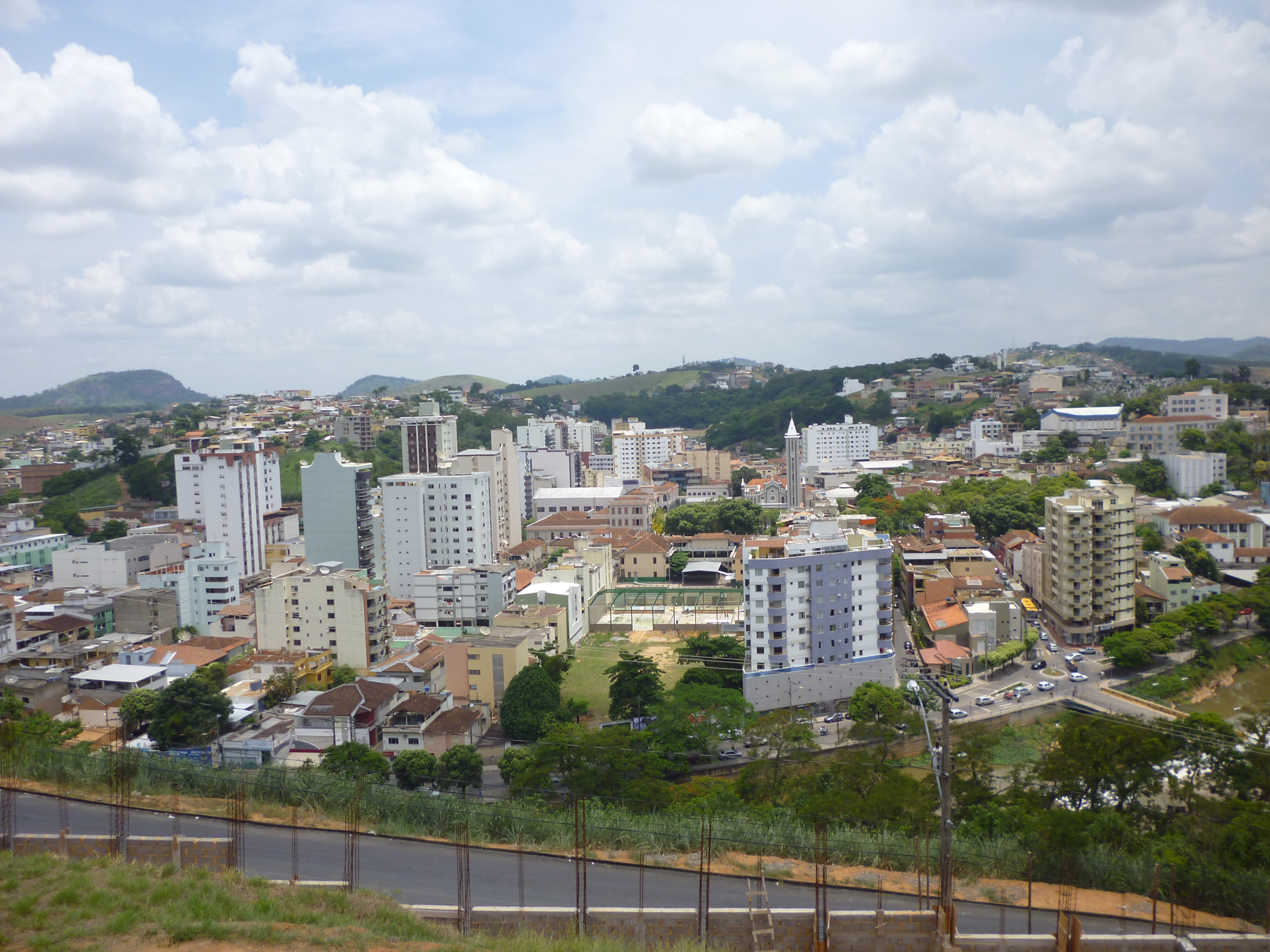
Partial view of Muriaé

According to the regional division in effect since 2017, established by the IBGE, the municipality belongs to the Juiz de Fora Intermediate and Muriaé Immediate Geographic Regions. Until then, with the divisions into microregions and mesoregions in effect, it was part of the Muriaé microregion, which in turn was included in the Zona da Mata mesoregion.

The municipality of Muriaé is entirely located within the Paraíba do Sul River basin. The main watercourses that flow through the municipality are the Muriaé River (a tributary of the Paraíba do Sul River) and the Glória River (a tributary of the Muriaé River).

== Education ==
The city has four institutions of higher education:

IFSUDESTE - Instituto Federal Sudeste de Minas Gerais

FAFISM – Faculdade de Filosofia, Ciências e Letras Santa Marcelina –

FAMINAS – Faculdade de Minas –

UNIPAC – Universidade Presidente Antonio Carlos

== Climate ==
Climate data for Muriaé (1981–2010)
Month	Jan	Feb	Mar	Apr	May	Jun	Jul	Aug	Sep	Oct	Nov	Dec	Year
Mean daily maximum °C (°F)	32.6 (90.7)	33.8 (92.8)	32.4 (90.3)	30.8 (87.4)	28.9 (84.0)	27.8 (82.0)	28.1 (82.6)	28.9 (84.0)	28.7 (83.7)	30.6 (87.1)	31.0 (87.8)	31.8 (89.2)	30.5 (86.9)
Daily mean °C (°F)	25.3 (77.5)	25.9 (78.6)	25.2 (77.4)	23.9 (75.0)	22.0 (71.6)	20.1 (68.2)	20.1 (68.2)	20.9 (69.6)	21.8 (71.2)	23.4 (74.1)	23.9 (75.0)	24.8 (76.6)	23.1 (73.6)
Mean daily minimum °C (°F)	20.7 (69.3)	21.0 (69.8)	20.5 (68.9)	19.1 (66.4)	17.0 (62.6)	14.9 (58.8)	14.8 (58.6)	15.4 (59.7)	17.0 (62.6)	18.4 (65.1)	19.3 (66.7)	20.3 (68.5)	18.2 (64.8)
Average precipitation mm (inches)	262.5 (10.33)	156.3 (6.15)	198.5 (7.81)	106.1 (4.18)	50.4 (1.98)	17.1 (0.67)	14.8 (0.58)	25.7 (1.01)	92.7 (3.65)	122.1 (4.81)	243.8 (9.60)	269.6 (10.61)	1,559.6 (61.40)
Average precipitation days (≥ 1.0 mm)	14	11	11	7	5	3	3	3	8	7	13	16	101
Average relative humidity (%)	77.6	75.8	77.0	76.5	76.4	75.1	74.8	74.0	77.3	76.6	78.8	79.6	76.6
Source: Instituto Nacional de Meteorologia

== Notable people ==
- Ney Mineiro (born 1981), Brazilian footballer

== See also ==
- List of municipalities in Minas Gerais
