= Mirante (disambiguation) =

Mirante is a municipality in the state of Bahia in Brazil.

Mirante may refer to:

== Places ==
- Mirante do Paranapanema, in São Paulo state
- Mirante da Serra, in Rondônia state
- Mirante do Vale, a skyscraper in São Paulo municipality

== People ==
- Antonio Mirante, Italian football player

== Other uses ==
- MFM Mirante Fund Management, an independent asset management firm
- O Mirante, a weekly regional newspaper
