= São Sebastião da Vargem Alegre =

Brazilian municipality

Coordinates: 21°4′19″S 42°38′9″W

- Municipality
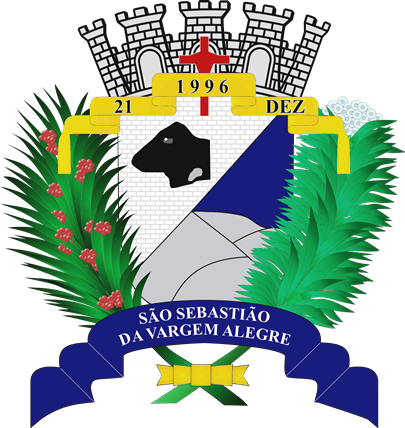
- Coat of arms
- Interactive map of São Sebastião da Vargem Alegre
- Country: Brazil
- State: Minas Gerais
- Region: Southeast
- Time zone: UTC−3 (BRT)

Location of São Sebastião da Vargem Alegre within Minas Gerais

São Sebastião da Vargem Alegre (commonly abbreviated as S.S.V.A.) is a Brazilian municipality located in the state of Minas Gerais. The city belongs to the mesoregion of Zona da Mata and to the microregion of Muriaé. As of 2020, the estimated population was 3,024. The municipality was founded by the "Law number 12.030, of december 21st 1995", emancipated from Miraí. Nearly 1,210 people voted regarding the act of emancipation, with an approval rate of 81.8%.

== Early history ==
Prior to the invasion of Portuguese colonizers, the region where the city is now located was inhabited by the indigenous ethnicity known by the exonym "Coroados". Circa 1903, the first milestone in the history of the city is established, the arrival of Manoel Rodrigues da Silva and his family, having acquired the initial terrain of 15 coffee alqueires, where the first house was built.

== See also ==
- List of municipalities in Minas Gerais
