= Ney Mineiro =

Brazilian footballer

Personal information
- Full name: Celsiney Ribeiro Pessoa
- Date of birth: 9 September 1981 (age 45)
- Place of birth: Muriaé, Minas Gerais, Brazil
- Height: 1.84 m (6 ft 0 in)
- Position: Striker

Team information
- Current team: Al-Khor

Youth career
- 1998–2000: Vasco

Senior career*
Years	Team	Apps	(Gls)
2001	Olaria		
2002	Bangu		
2002	Corinthians-AL		
2003	Ipatinga		
2003	Bahia		
2004	Camaçari		
2005	Floresta RJ		
2006	Votoraty		
2007	Mirassol		
2008	Teresópolis		
2009–2010	São Bernardo		
2010	São Caetano		
2010–2011	Al-Khor	18	(5)
2011–	São Bernardo		(3)
- * Club domestic league appearances and goals

Celsiney Ribeiro Pessoa (born 9 September 1981), commonly known as Ney Mineiro, is a Brazilian footballer. He currently plays for São Bernardo in Brazil.

== Honours ==
- Juniors Campeonato Carioca (1):
  - 2001
- Campeonato Alagoano (1):
  - 2002
