= Ataulfo Alves =

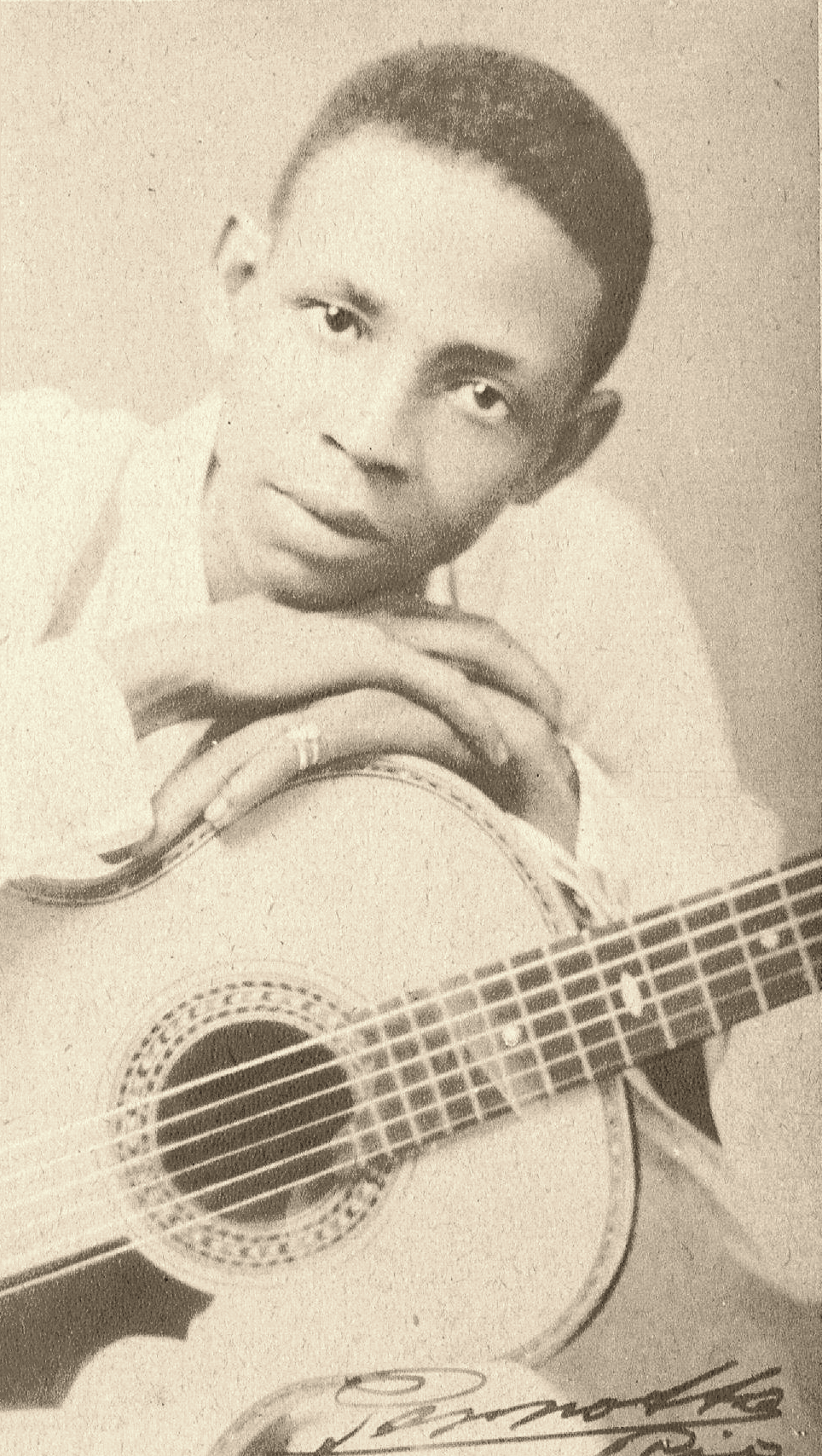

Background information
- Born: Ataulfo Alves de Sousa; 2 May 1909; Miraí, Minas Gerais, Brazil
- Died: 29 April 1969 (aged 59) Rio de Janeiro, Brazil
- Genres: Samba
- Occupations: Musician, composer, and singer
- Years active: 1929–1969

Ataulfo Alves de Sousa (2 May 1909 – 29 April 1969) was a Brazilian samba singer and composer, best known for his collaborations with Mário Lago, such as with Ai! que saudade da Amélia and Atire a primeira pedra, as well as songs such as Laranja madura and Mulata assanhada.

== Biography ==
Alves was born on 2 May 1909, in the town of Miraí, in the Zona da Mata region of Minas Gerais. He was one of seven children to guitarist, accordionist, and repentista "Capitão" Severino. By age 8, Ataulfo had begun to write his own lyrics. He worked various odd jobs while in school, such as a milk deliveryman, cattle steerer, suitcase carrier, shoeshiner, cabinetmaker, and farmer. His father died when he was 10. His mother, soon after, moved with her children to the center of town.

At 18 years old, Alves moved to Rio de Janeiro, accompanying a doctor with whom he worked each day as an assistant at his pharmacy. At 19, he played the violão, cavaquinho, and the bandolim. He married Judite and had 5 children with her.

At 20 years old, he began to compose and became director of harmony with Fale Quem Quiser, a bloco organized by people within the neighbourhood of Rio Comprido.

In 1933, Almirante recorded the samba Sexta-feira, his first composition to be released as a recording. Days after, Carmen Miranda recorded his composition Tempo Perdido, guaranteeing Alves' entrance into the artistic world. In 1958, he appeared in the film Three Loves in Rio. His discography exceeds 320 songs, being one of the most famous names in Brazilian popular music during the time in which he was active. Important interpreters, such as Clara Nunes, Luiz Melodia, Alaíde Costa, and Fabiana Cozza, have sung versions of his music.

Alves died in Rio de Janeiro due to an ulcer worsening after surgery. He died only a few days before his 60th birthday. He was buried in Cemitério do Catumbi, in the North Zone of Rio de Janeiro.

On the anniversary of his birth, in Miraí, in 2009, the city promoted the construction of a mausoleum to shelter his remains and his relatives that have since passed. The memorial is located at São Francisco de Assis cemetery. There is also a memorial collection of the composer in the city, inaugurated in 2005. The permanent exhibition contains objects that had once belonged to Alves and images of his life, alongside personalities from the national and international scenes, and of national politics.

In 2009, he was posthumously awarded the Ordem do Mérito Cultural.

In 2017, with the creation of the Academia Miraiense de Letras, Alves received a posthumous tribute, being proclaimed Perpetrual Patron on the second seat, referencing his birthdate of 2 May.

== Biggest hits ==
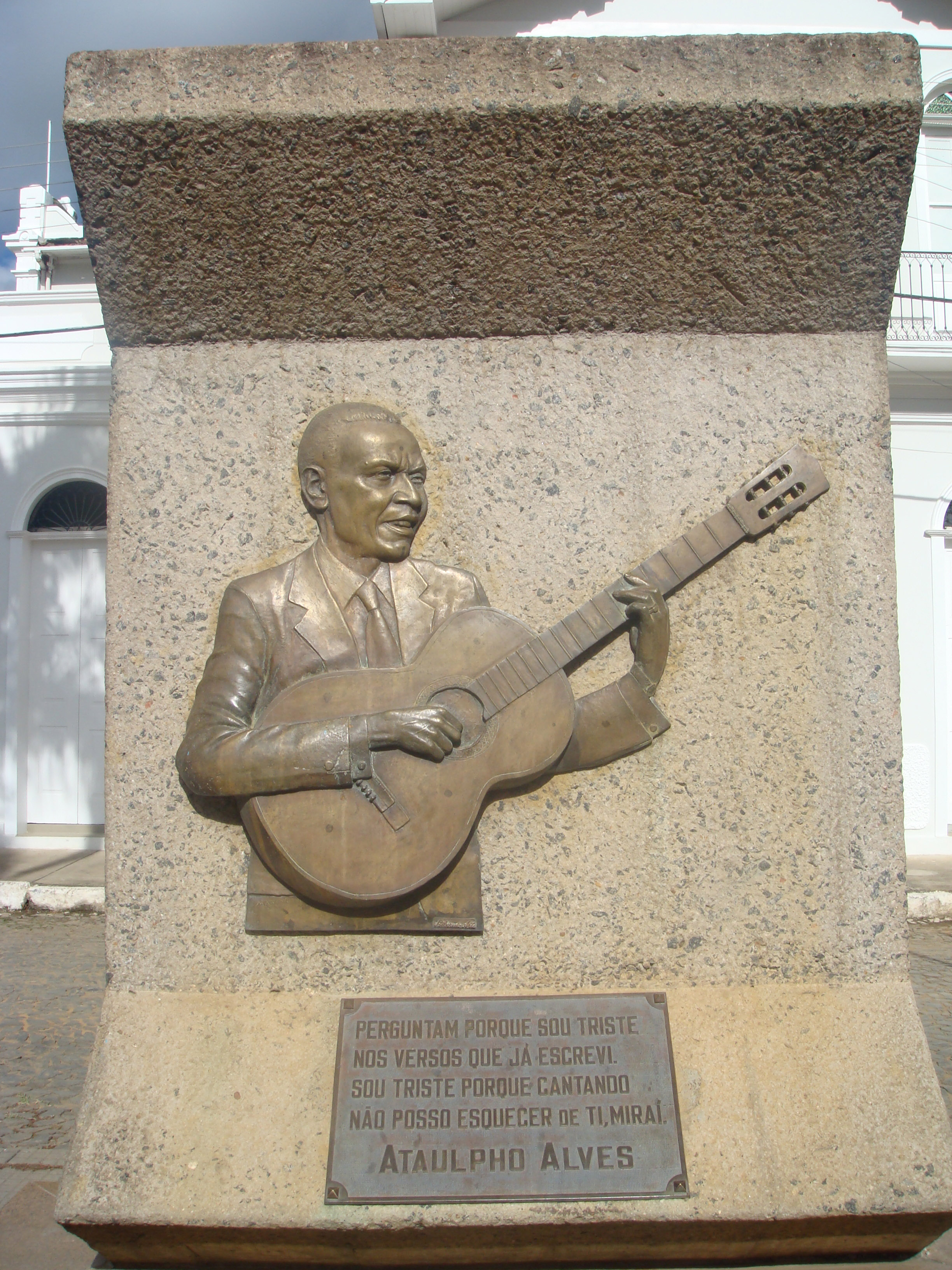
A monument in tribute to Alves in his hometown

- Ai! que saudade da Amélia (with Mário Lago);
- Atire a primeira pedra (with Mário Lago);
- Bom crioulo;
- Errei, erramos (with Arthur Vargas Junior);
- Errei, sim;
- Faz como eu;
- Gente bem também samba;
- Jubileu;
- Laranja madura;
- Leva meu samba;
- Meus tempos de criança;
- Marcha pró-oriente;
- Mulata assanhada;
- Na cadência do samba (with Paulo Gesta);
- Nem que chova canivete;
- O bonde de São Januário (with Wilson Batista);
- O homem e o cão (with Arthur Vargas Junior);
- Oh! Seu Oscar (with Wilson Batista);
- Pois é;
- Requebro da mulata;
- Sei que é covardia (with Claudionor Cruz);
- Vai, mas vai mesmo;
- Vida da minha vida;
- Vassalo do samba.

== Discography ==
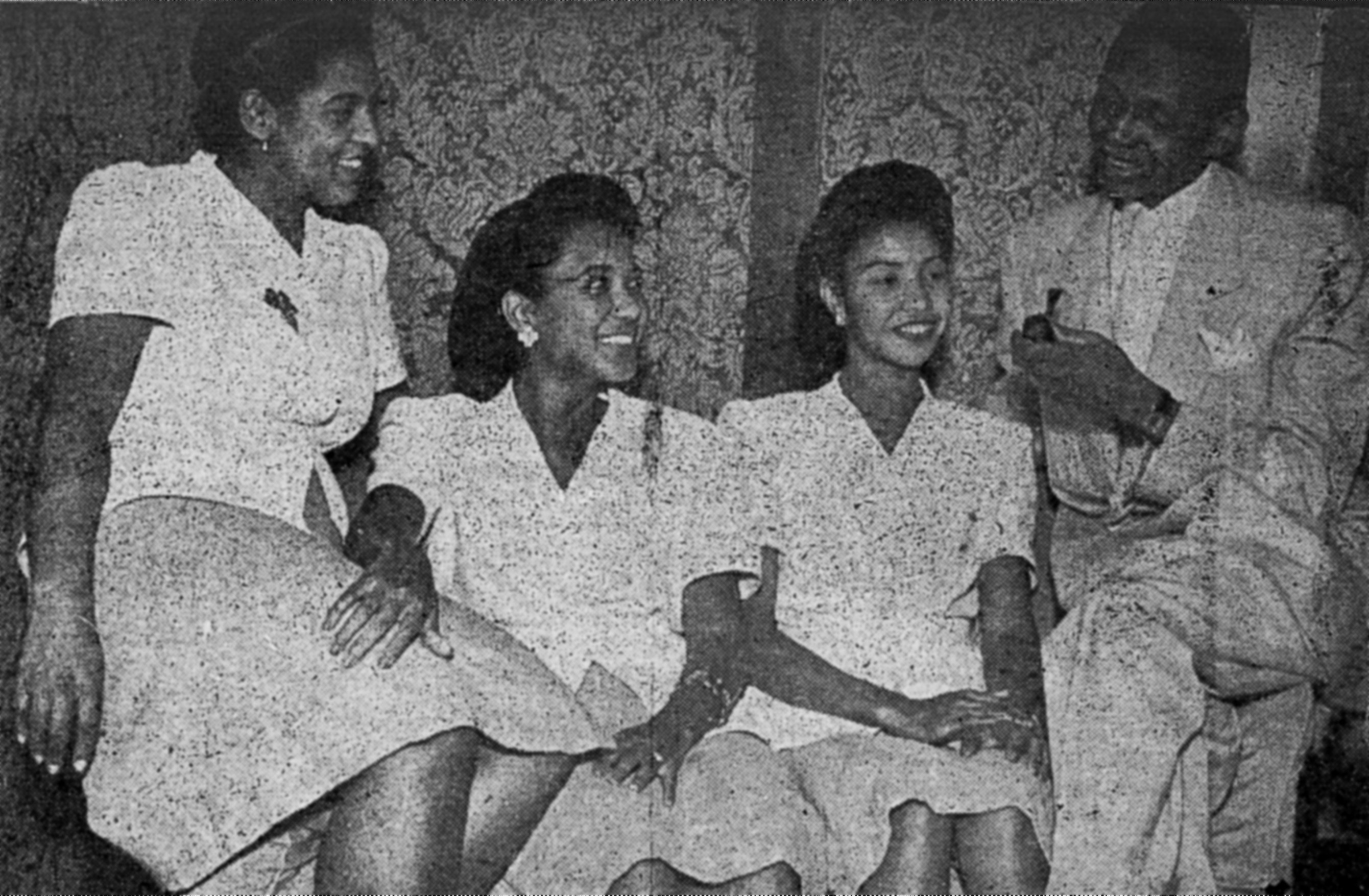
Ataulfo Alves e Suas Pastoras, 1945

- 1959 — Ataulfo Alves e Suas Pastoras;
- 1962 — Meu Samba... Minha Vida (Ataulfo Alves com Orquestra);
- 1966 — Eternamente Samba;
- 1968 — Ataulfo Alves e Seus Sucessos;
- 1968 — Ataulfo Alves e Muito Samba;
- 1970 — Ataulfo Alves;
- 1977 — Nova História da MPB — Ataulfo Alves.

== Bibliography ==
- Fernandes, Vagner. Clara Nunes: Guerreira da Utopia. Rio de Janeiro: Ediouro, 2007.
