= Antônio Prado de Minas =

Municipality in Minas Gerais, Brazil

Coordinates: 21°00′57″S 42°06′32″W

- Municipality
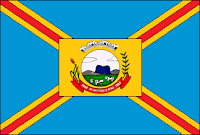
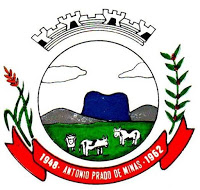
- Flag Coat of arms
- Interactive map of Antônio Prado de Minas
- Country: Brazil
- State: Minas Gerais
- Region: Southeast
- Time zone: UTC−3 (BRT)

Location of Antônio Prado de Minas within Minas Gerais. Tiny red spot close to Northwest Rio de Janeiro

Antônio Prado de Minas is a municipality in the state of Minas Gerais, Brazil. Its population as of 2020 is estimated to be 1,587 people living in an area of 85.04 km^{2} (32.83 sq mi). The city belongs to the microregion of Muriaé within the mesoregion of Zona da Mata.

== See also ==
- List of municipalities in Minas Gerais
