= Barão de Monte Alto =

Brazilian municipality located in the state of Minas Gerais

Coordinates: 21°14′42″S 42°14′16″W

- Municipality
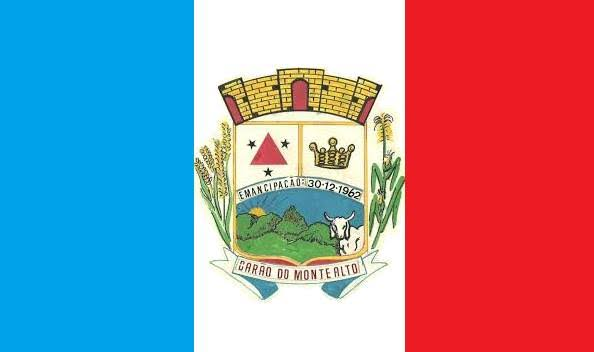
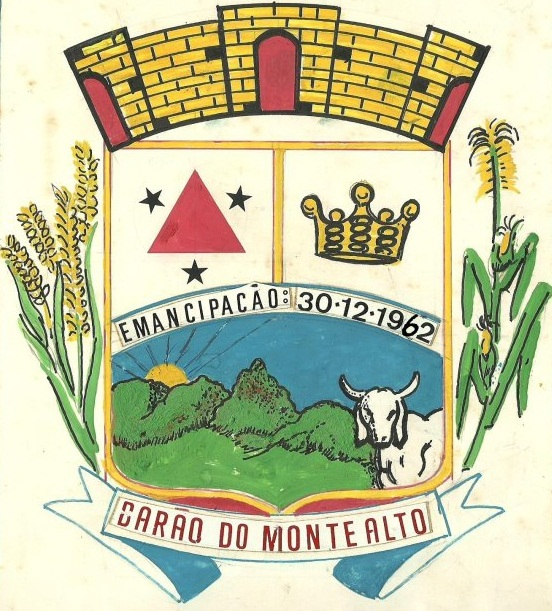
- Flag Coat of arms
- Interactive map of Barão de Monte Alto
- Country: Brazil
- State: Minas Gerais
- Region: Southeast
- Time zone: UTC−3 (BRT)

Location of Barão de Monte Alto within Minas Gerais

Barão de Monte Alto is a municipality in the state of Minas Gerais, Brazil. Its population in 2020 was estimated to be 5,354 people living in a total area of 199.1 km^{2} (76.9 sq mi). The city belongs to the mesoregion of Zona da Mata and to the microregion of Muriaé.

== See also ==
- List of municipalities in Minas Gerais
