= Eugenópolis =

Brazilian municipality located in the state of Minas Gerais

- Municipality
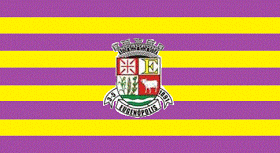
- Flag
- Interactive map of Eugenópolis
- Country: Brazil
- State: Minas Gerais
- Region: Southeast
- Time zone: UTC−3 (BRT)

Location of Eugenópolis within Minas Gerais

Eugenópolis is a Brazilian municipality located in the state of Minas Gerais. The city belongs to the Mesoregion of Zona da Mata and to the Microregion of Muriaé. As of 2020, the estimated population was 11,330.

== See also ==
- List of municipalities in Minas Gerais
