= Russas =

Municipality in Ceará, Brazil

Coordinates: 4.94°S 37.9758°W

- Municipality
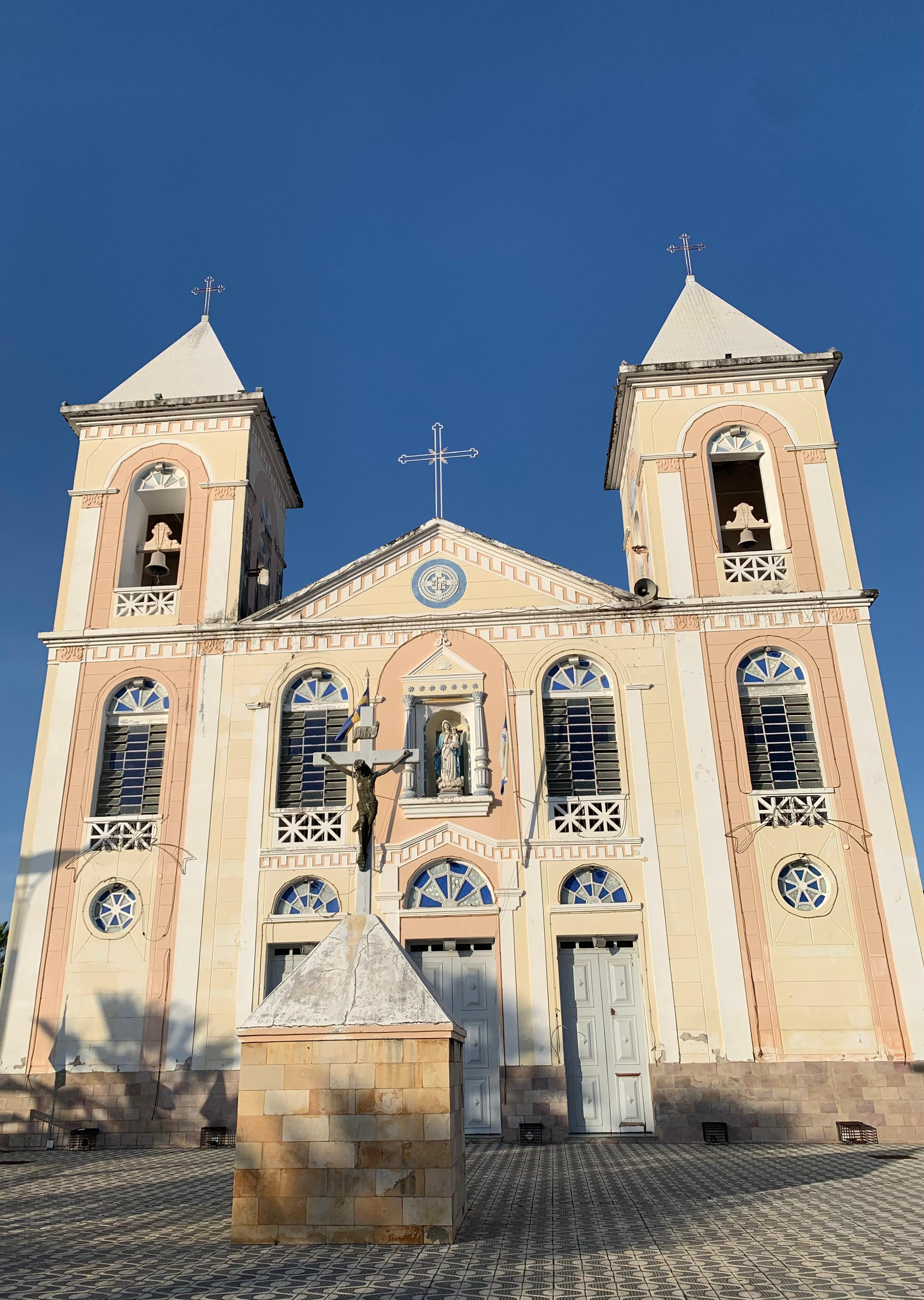

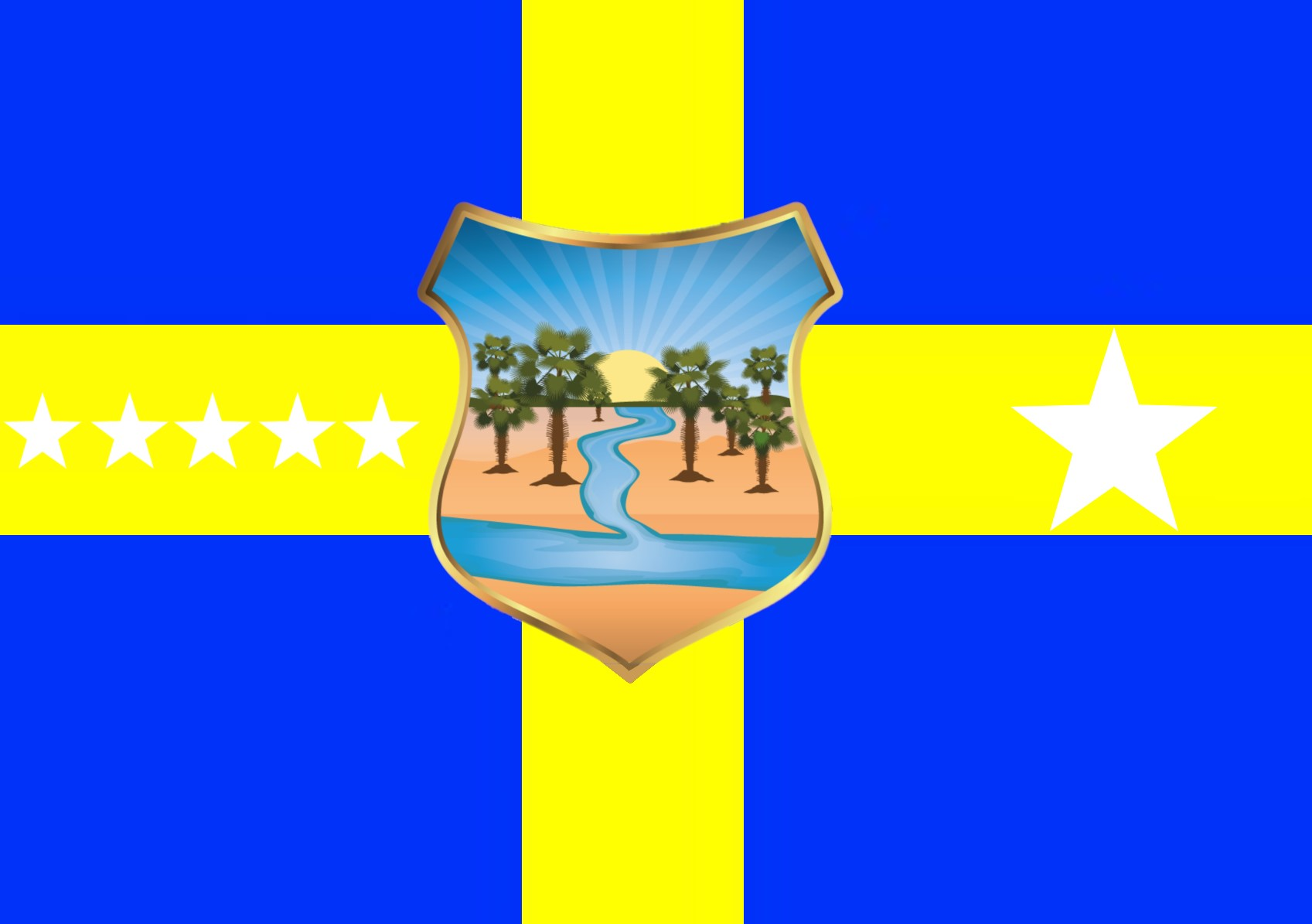
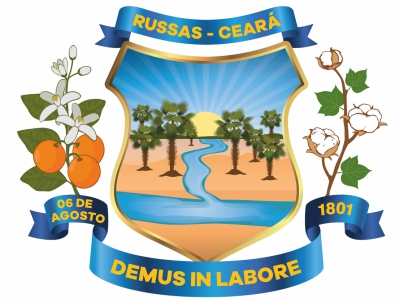
- Flag Coat of arms
- Interactive map of Russas
- Country: Brazil
- Region: Nordeste
- State: Ceará
- Mesoregion: Jaguaribe
- Founded: August 6, 1801

Government
  - Mayor: Sávio Gurgel Nogueira (PSB)
- Elevation: 92 ft (28 m)

Population (2020)
  - Total: 78,882
  - Density: 113.7/sq mi (43.91/km^{2})
- Time zone: UTC−3 (BRT)
- Website: http://russas.ce.gov.br/

Russas is a municipality in the state of Ceará in the Northeast region of Brazil.

The municipality of Russas is an economic hub with the growing development of its services, industrial expansion, agribusiness, and tertiary education, reinforcing its status as the central city of Jaguaribe region. According to the 2022 Census, the municipality has a population of 72,928 inhabitants.

== Economy ==
Blessed by the fertile soil of the Jaguaribe Valley, Russas was initially a center for cattle farming, then for cotton cultivation, later for carnauba (Copernicia prunifera) wax extraction, and eventually for orange cultivation. The latter earned it the title of "Land of the Sweet Orange", as the region's oranges became a true brand, the nationally known "Russas Orange". Today, in addition to oranges, the area produces watermelon, banana, guava, grapes, and other fruits for export. Local fruit farming experienced significant quantitative and qualitative growth with the expansion of the Tabuleiro de Russas Irrigation Perimeter, one of the largest in the country. Commerce and industry are also major drivers of the local economy, as Russas hosts numerous ceramics factories, a Dakota Nordeste shoe factory, and large companies have established operations in the city, such as Mix Mateus (large supermarket company), which opened in 2024 and has a sales area of 2,670 m²; Agrocera, a carnauba wax industry; and the Lagoinha Solar Park, the first greenfield solar energy park developed by CGN Brazil. Additionally, the municipality houses federal and state government administrative bodies, which increases the flow of residents from other cities.

== Culture ==
Russas is home to a theater company, OFICARTE Teatro & CIA, a nonprofit cultural association founded on July 4, 1990, which is a cultural reference in the region and manages the Galpão das Artes, a multifunctional cultural space dedicated to art classes, performing arts presentations, and small musical shows.

The municipality also has a Unified Arts and Sports Center (CEU das Artes, in portuguese), a project that is part of the Growth Acceleration Program (PAC) and integrates sociocultural, social assistance, recreational, sports, training, and qualification activities. Located in the Lagoa do Toco neighborhood and covering an area of 3,000 square meters, the CEU features a cine-theater, library, telecenter, multipurpose rooms, skate and walking tracks, sports courts, and other attractions.

In recent years, Russas has also stood out in cinema with the creation of CINEJAGUAR and the production of films by local director Allan Deberton, who directed and produced the films Doce de Coco and Pacarrete.

The short film Doce de Coco was filmed in the Jaguaribe River and released in 2010, receiving critical acclaim and winning awards at the V National Cinema and Video Festival of the Sertões, Chapada dos Guimarães Women's Film Festival, VI Aruanda Festival of Brazilian Cinema, 8th Maringá Film Festival, 21st Ibero-American Film Festival, 5th Cinema with Farinha Festival, among others.

Pacarrete, starred by Marcélia Cartaxo, which tells the story of a professional ballerina and dance teacher, as well as an artistic education and physical education educator, who spent her last decades being regarded as crazy, brought Russas to the world, as its story and performances were well-received by critics and audiences alike, earning important awards at the Gramado Film Festival, Los Angeles Brazilian Film Festival, Guarani Award, SESC Best Films Festival, and the Grande Prêmio Cinema Brasileiro, among others.

== Tertiary education ==
Due to its central and strategic location, Russas has hosted the campus of the Federal University of Ceará (UFC) since August 4, 2014, serving approximately 1,400 students and having a significant impact on the local and regional social dynamics. The university currently offers bachelor's degrees in Computer science, Civil engineering, Production engineering, Software engineering, and Mechanical engineering, as well as an Academic Master's in Civil engineering. The campus covers an area of 50 hectares, where two academic buildings, the Library, the Technology Park, the Entrepreneurship Complex, and the University Cafeteria have already been built, with plans for the construction of additional academic blocks to accommodate future courses.

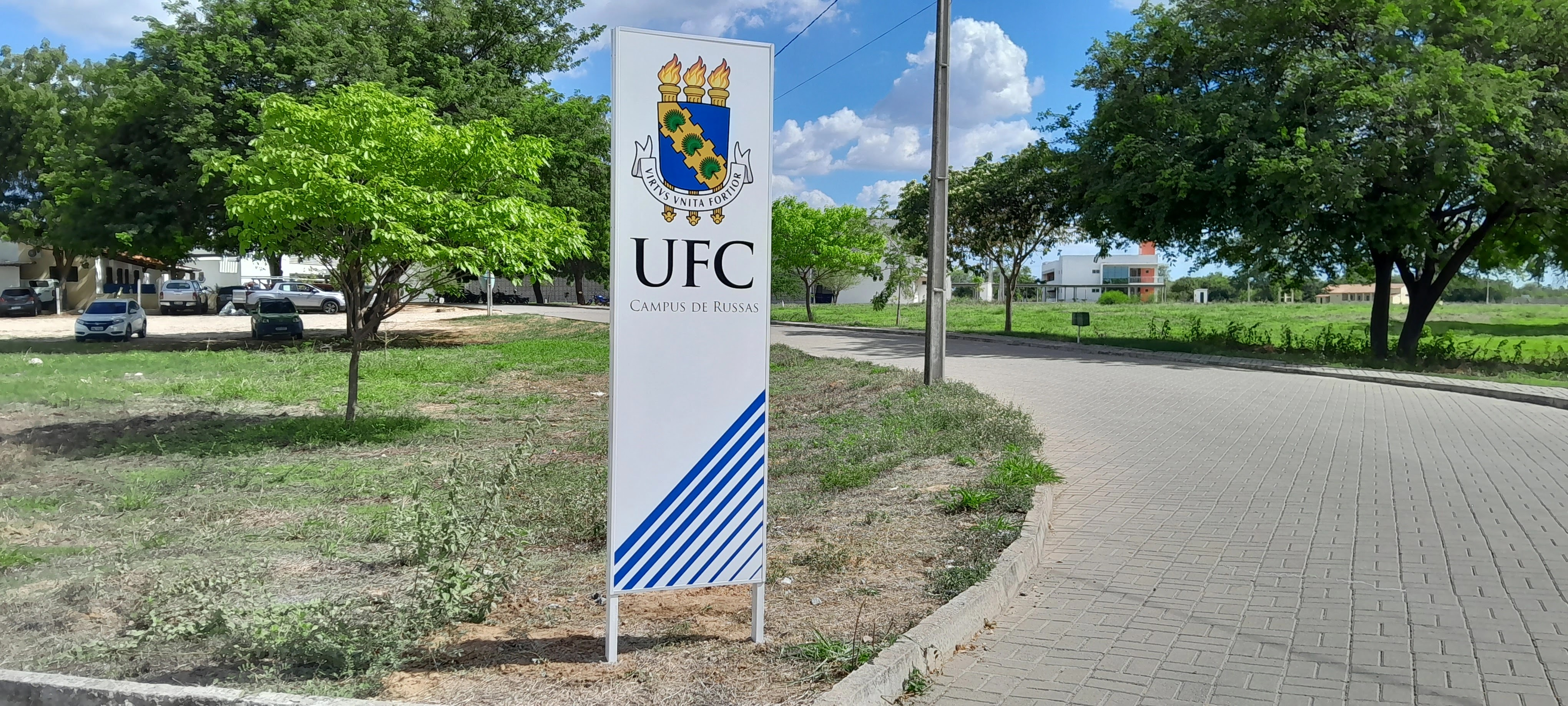
Federal University of Ceará

The 10 years of the university in Russas have positively impacted the region, transforming it into a prominent educational center. Since its inauguration, the campus has attracted a significant number of people from various cities and regions in Brazil, as well as students from other countries, highlighting the growing relevance of the institution in the academic landscape. This constant flow of students and professionals from different places has not only energized the local economy but also fostered an enriching cultural exchange for Russas and its surroundings.

The presence of people from other locations has increased the demand for housing, services, and commerce in the region, resulting in the growth of the real estate sector, restaurants, and small businesses. Furthermore, the diversity of cultures and perspectives brought by students from other states and countries has contributed to creating a more plural and innovative academic environment, favoring the intellectual and social development of the entire community.

The positive impact also extends to the regional job market, as the courses offered by the university train highly qualified professionals, many of whom choose to remain in the region after graduation, directly contributing to economic and social development.

Thus, Russas has established itself as a hub of knowledge and innovation, attracting talent from different parts of Brazil and the world, boosting the local economy, and promoting a cultural and academic exchange that benefits the entire Jaguaribe region.

== Government agencies ==
Due to its central geographic location in the region, Russas hosts numerous essential public agencies that provide important services to the Municipality and neighboring cities, such as the Federal Revenue Service, the National Institute of Social Security, Caixa Econômica Federal, Banco do Brasil, the Federal Highway Police, the National Department of Transport Infrastructure, the Medical Examiner’s Office (PEFOCE/IML), the State Traffic Department, the Regional Civil Police Station, the Military Police Battalion, and other agencies.

== See also ==
- List of municipalities in Ceará
