= Vieiras =

Brazilian municipality located in the state of Minas Gerais

Coordinates: 20°51′57″S 42°14′38″W

- Municipality
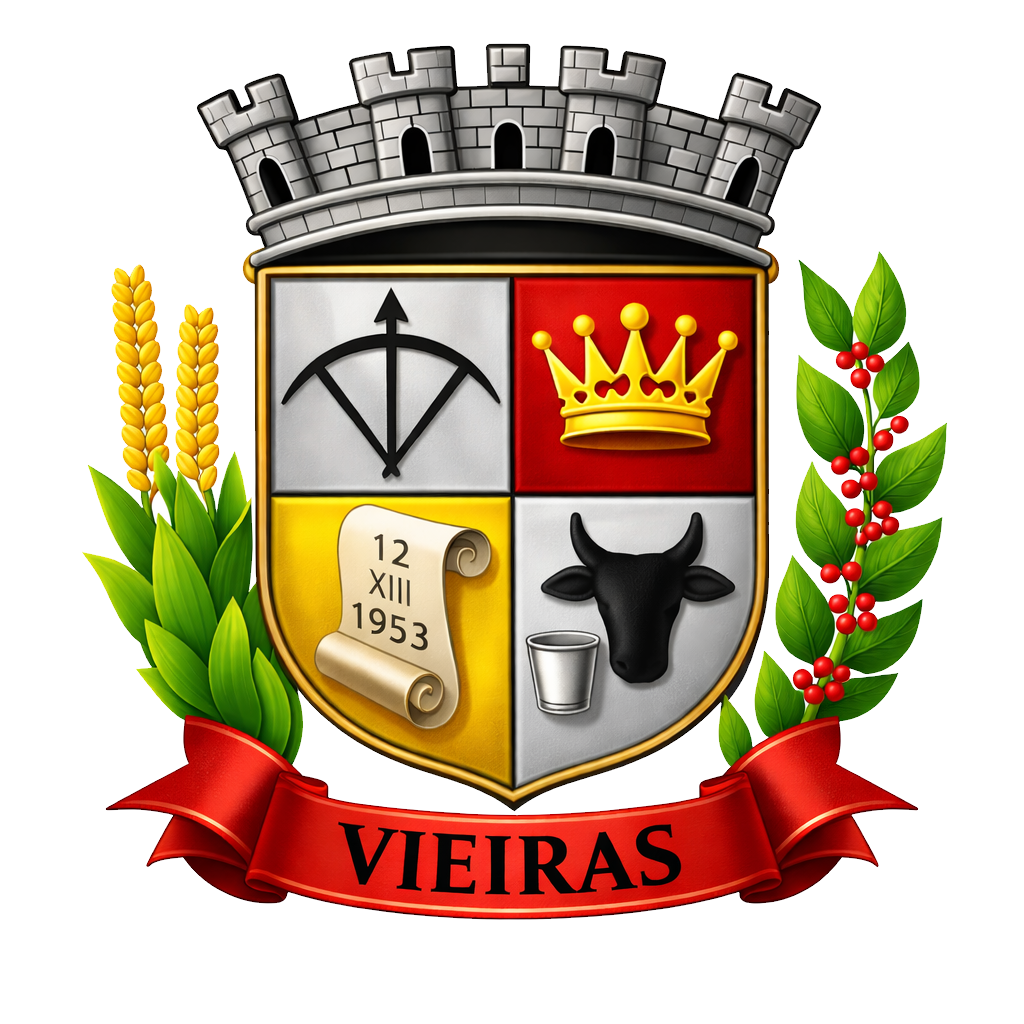
- Coat of arms
- Interactive map of Vieiras
- Country: Brazil
- State: Minas Gerais
- Region: Southeast
- Time zone: UTC−3 (BRT)

Location of Vieiras within Minas Gerais

Vieiras is a Brazilian municipality located in the state of Minas Gerais. The city belongs to the mesoregion of Zona da Mata and to the microregion of Muriaé. As of 2020, the estimated population was 3,589.

== See also ==
- List of municipalities in Minas Gerais
