= São Francisco do Glória =

Brazilian municipality located in the state of Minas Gerais

Coordinates: 20°48′S 42°16′W

- Municipality
- Interactive map of São Francisco do Glória
- Country: Brazil
- State: Minas Gerais
- Region: Southeast
- Time zone: UTC−3 (BRT)

Location of São Francisco do Glória within Minas Gerais

São Francisco do Glória is a Brazilian municipality located in the state of Minas Gerais. The city belongs to the mesoregion of Zona da Mata and to the microregion of Muriaé. As of 2020, the estimated population was 4,800.

== See also ==
- List of municipalities in Minas Gerais
