= Mirante =

Municipality of Bahia, Brazil

- Municipality
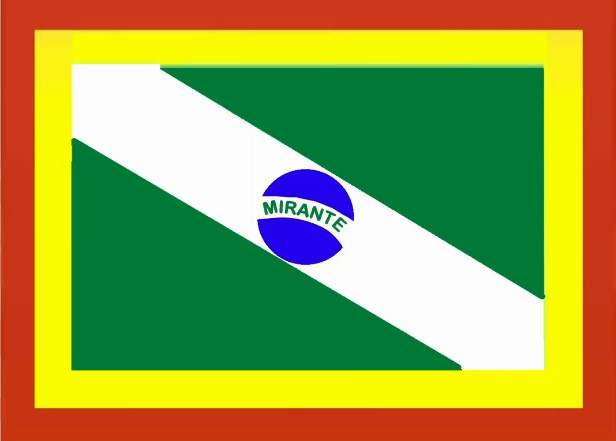
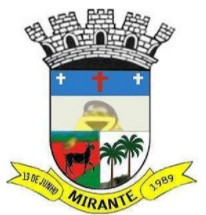
- Flag Coat of arms

- Location in Bahia state

- Location in Brazil
- Coordinates: 14°14′31″S 40°46′22″W
- Country: Brazil
- Region: Northeast
- State: Bahia

Area
  - Total: 1,173 km^{2} (453 sq mi)

Population (2020)
  - Total: 8,447
  - Density: 7.201/km^{2} (18.65/sq mi)
- Time zone: UTC−3 (BRT)

Mirante is a municipality in the state of Bahia in Brazil. The population is 8,447 (2020 est.) in an area of 1173 km^{2}.
