= Patrocínio do Muriaé =

Brazilian municipality located in the state of Minas Gerais

Coordinates: 21°09′S 42°12′W

- Municipality
- Flag Coat of arms
- Interactive map of Patrocínio do Muriaé
- Country: Brazil
- State: Minas Gerais
- Region: Southeast
- Time zone: UTC−3 (BRT)

Location of Patrocínio do Muriaé within Minas Gerais

Patrocínio do Muriaé is a Brazilian municipality located in the state of Minas Gerais. The city belongs to the mesoregion of Zona da Mata and to the microregion of Muriaé. As of 2020, the estimated population was 5,715.

== See also ==
- List of municipalities in Minas Gerais
