= Rosário da Limeira =

Municipality in Minas Gerais, Brazil

Coordinates: 20°59′S 42°31′W

- Municipality
- Interactive map of Rosário da Limeira
- Country: Brazil
- State: Minas Gerais
- Region: Southeast
- Time zone: UTC−3 (BRT)

Location of Rosário da Limeira within Minas Gerais

Rosário da Limeira is a municipality in the state of Minas Gerais, Brazil. The city belongs to the mesoregion of Zona da Mata and to the microregion of Muriaé. As of 2020, the estimated population was 4,622.

== See also ==
- List of municipalities in Minas Gerais
