= Miraí =

- Flag Coat of arms

- Location in the state of Minas Gerais
- Coordinates: 21°11′42″S 42°36′50″W
- Country: Brazil
- State: Minas Gerais
- Settled: 1923

Government
  - Mayor: José Ronaldo Milani (2013-2016)

Area
  - Total: 320,628 km^{2} (123,795 sq mi)
- Elevation: 300 m (980 ft)

Population (2020)
  - Total: 15,111
  - Density: 38.7/km^{2} (100/sq mi)
  - Demonym: Miraiense
- Time zone: UTC−3 (BRT)
- Postal Code (CEP): 36790-000
- Area code: 32

Miraí is a Brazilian municipality located in the state of Minas Gerais. The city belongs to the mesoregion of Zona da Mata and to the microregion of Muriaé.

- Main Rivers: Fubá and Muriaé

== History ==
Brejo was its first name. The agriculture sector is pointed as one of the most successful of the region Zona da Mata. The city territory is located in a region of easy access due to the presence of Rio-Bahia highway, also called BR-116. The first village was set up on the margins of the Muriaé River. Around 1840, attracted by land fertility, the first explorers came to Miraí's region. Finding land and good water, they spread the news and eventually other farmers arrived. At 1852, a group of farmers acquired part of the land belonging to the farm named Três Barras, in the place they built a chapel to Santo Antônio and around grew a village called Brejo. Later, the village became the District of Paz, with the name of Santo Antônio do Muriaé, belonging to Freguesia de Santa Rita de Meia Pataca. At 1883, the district was turned into Freguesia de Santo Antônio do Camapuã. The name was changed to Miraí, which means "wet land" in Tupi, by 1895. The municipality was created in 1923, separating itself from Cataguases.

== Attractions ==
The town presents as natural attractions countless waterfalls.

The Carnival Parade is very traditional, attracting tourist from all over the country.

In September the city host the Festival Samba and Botequim, a cultural event offering good music and regional cuisine, by the bus station.

=== Ataulfo Alves ===
Ataulfo Alves was the most famous person to be born in Miraí, he is known as one of the best samba compositor of the second half of the 20th century, there is a museum to his memory in the city.

== Disasters ==
In January 2007, the city was victim of a flooding with catastrophic proportions after the collapse of a barrage belonging to the company Rio Pomba Cataguases, more than 2 billion liters of water mixed with mud and chemical waste used on the extraction of bauxite was dumped in the city causing its destruction and affecting the Muriaé River, hence destroying many cities on its way to the Atlantic Ocean.

This was the second accident to happen in the region caused by this company. The damage to the environment was unmeasurable.

== Sources ==
- Secretaria da Cultura, em 1 de outubro de 1999
- Assembléia Legislativa do Estado de Minas Gerais

== See also ==
- List of municipalities in Minas Gerais
