= Fervedouro =

Municipality in Minas Gerais, Brazil

Coordinates: 20°43′33″S 42°16′44″W

- Municipality
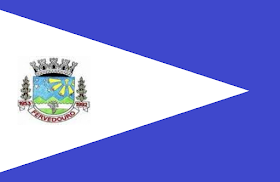
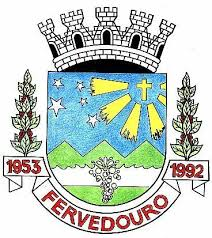
- Flag Coat of arms
- Interactive map of Fervedouro
- Country: Brazil
- State: Minas Gerais
- Region: Southeast
- Time zone: UTC−3 (BRT)

Location of Fervedouro within Minas Gerais

Fervedouro is a Brazilian municipality located in the state of Minas Gerais. The city belongs to the mesoregion of Zona da Mata and to the microregion of Muriaé. As of 2020, the estimated population was 11,054.

== See also ==
- List of municipalities in Minas Gerais
