= Campinas =

- Municipality
- Municipality of Campinas
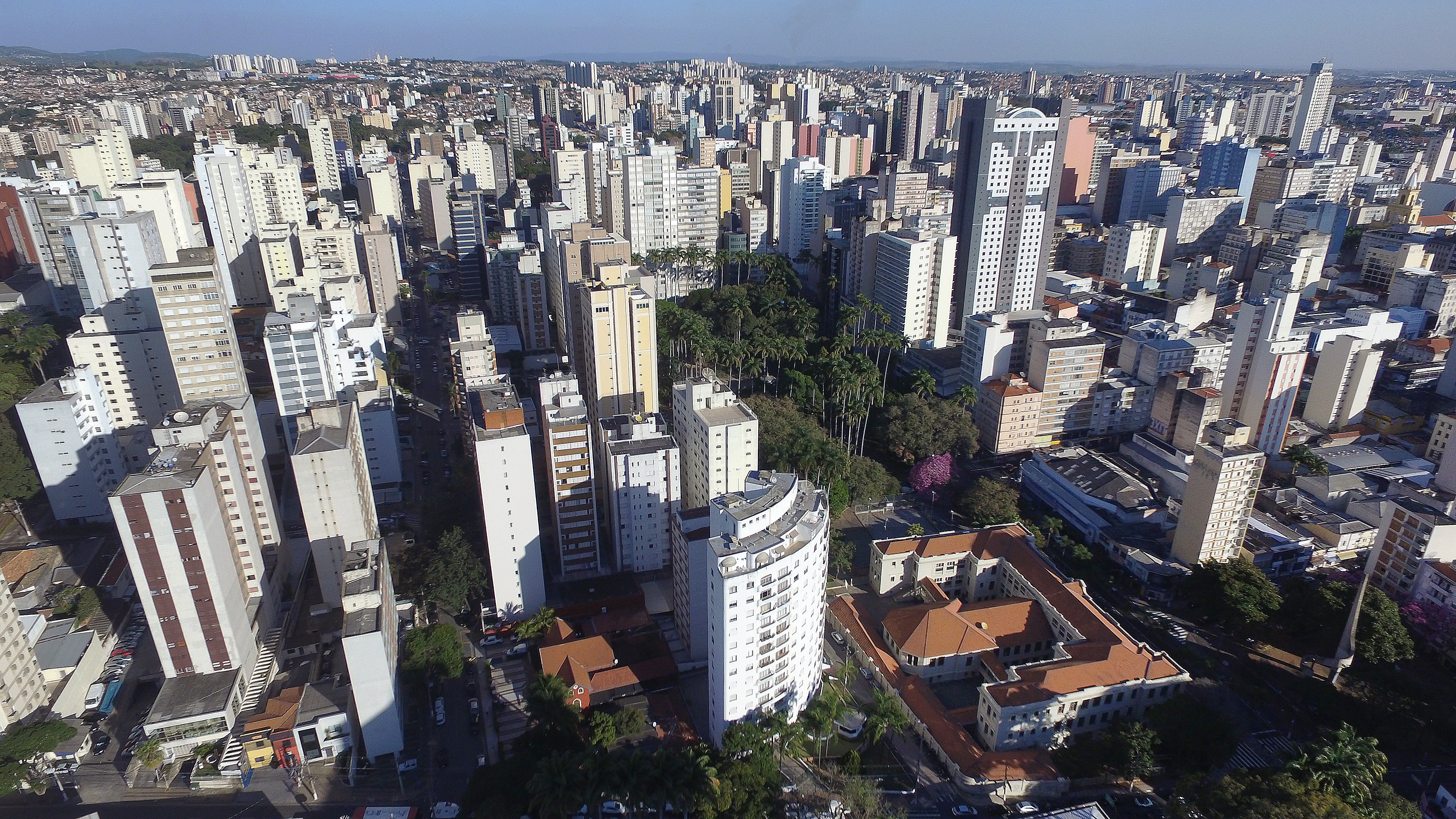
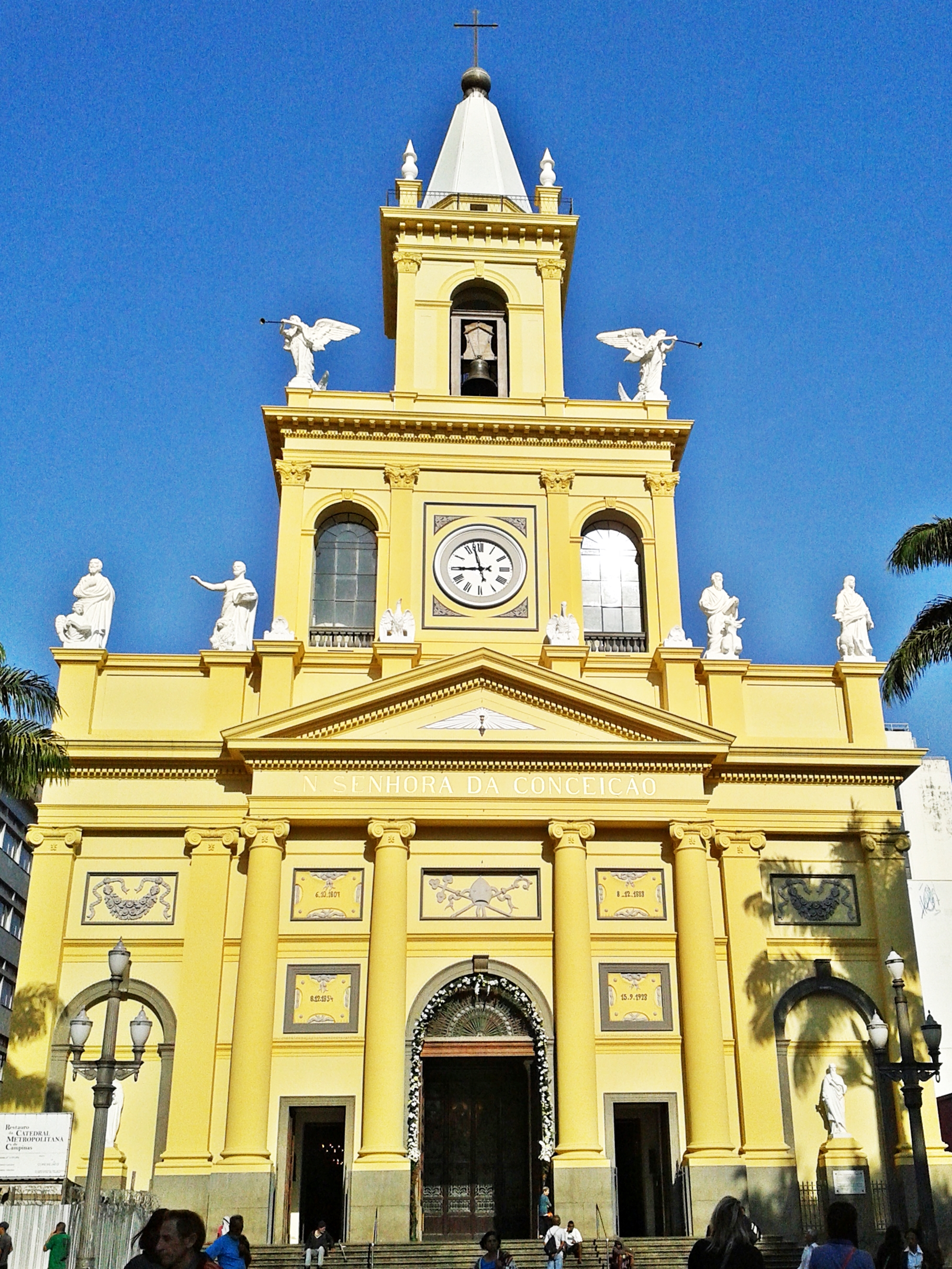
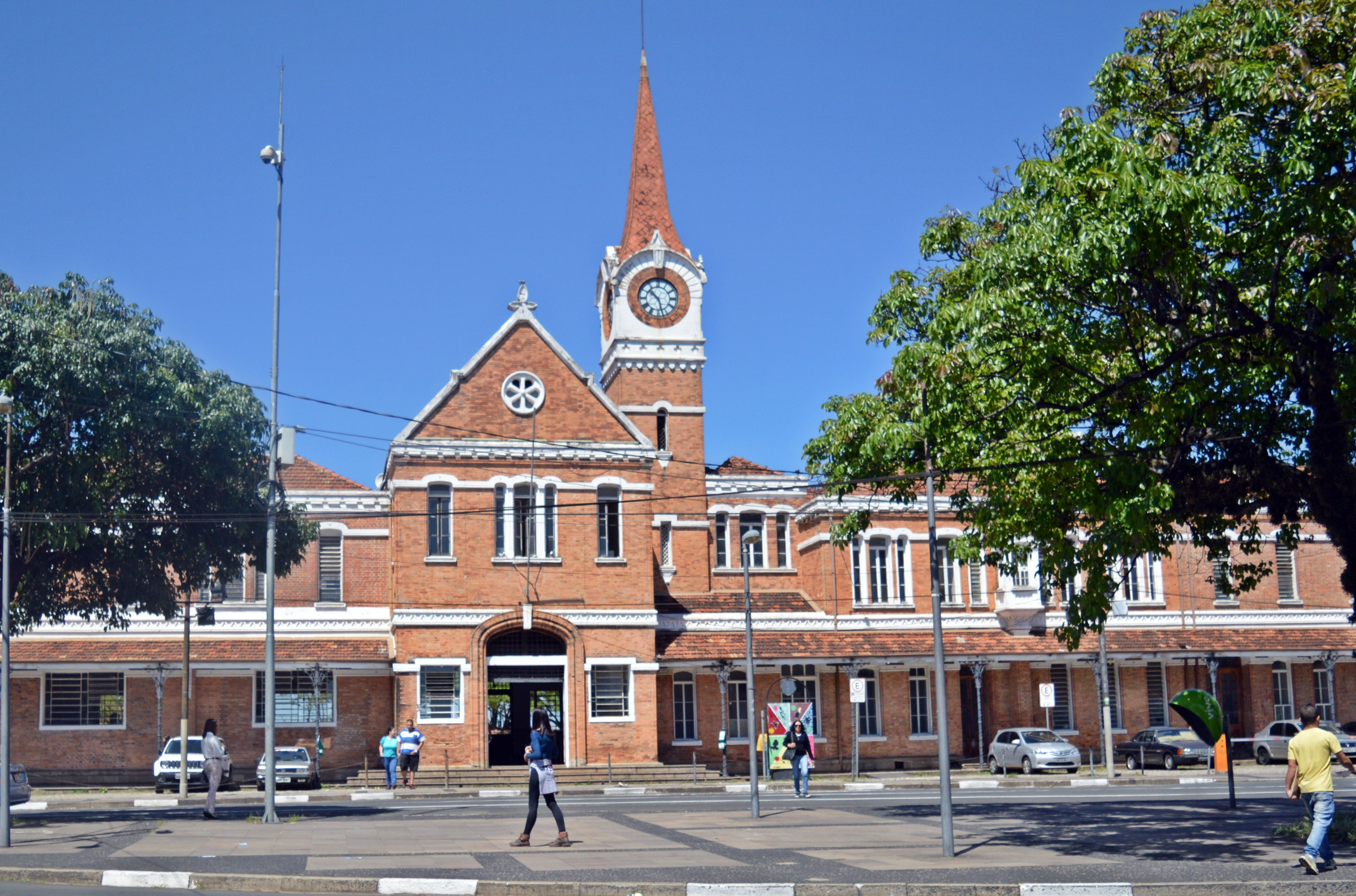
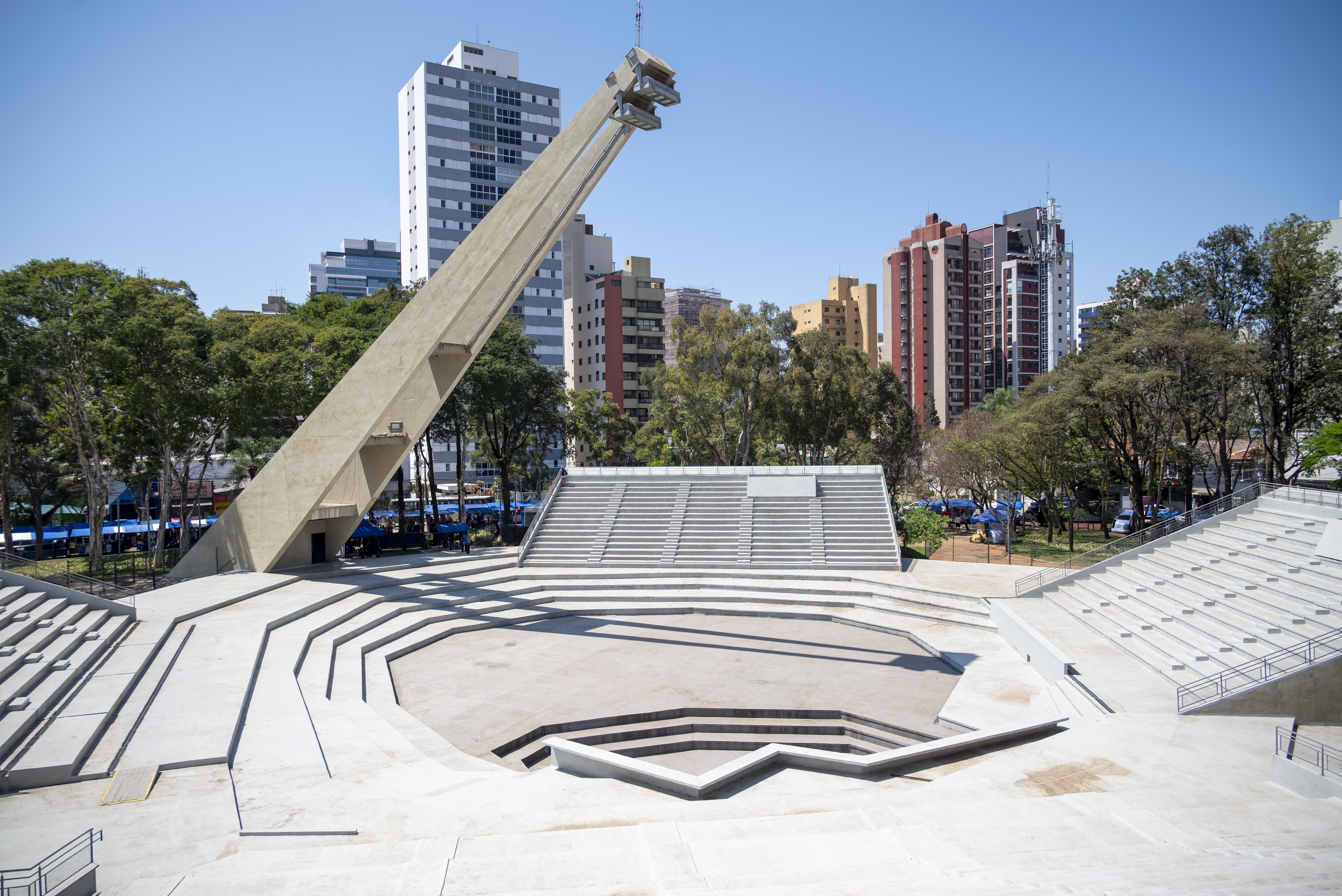
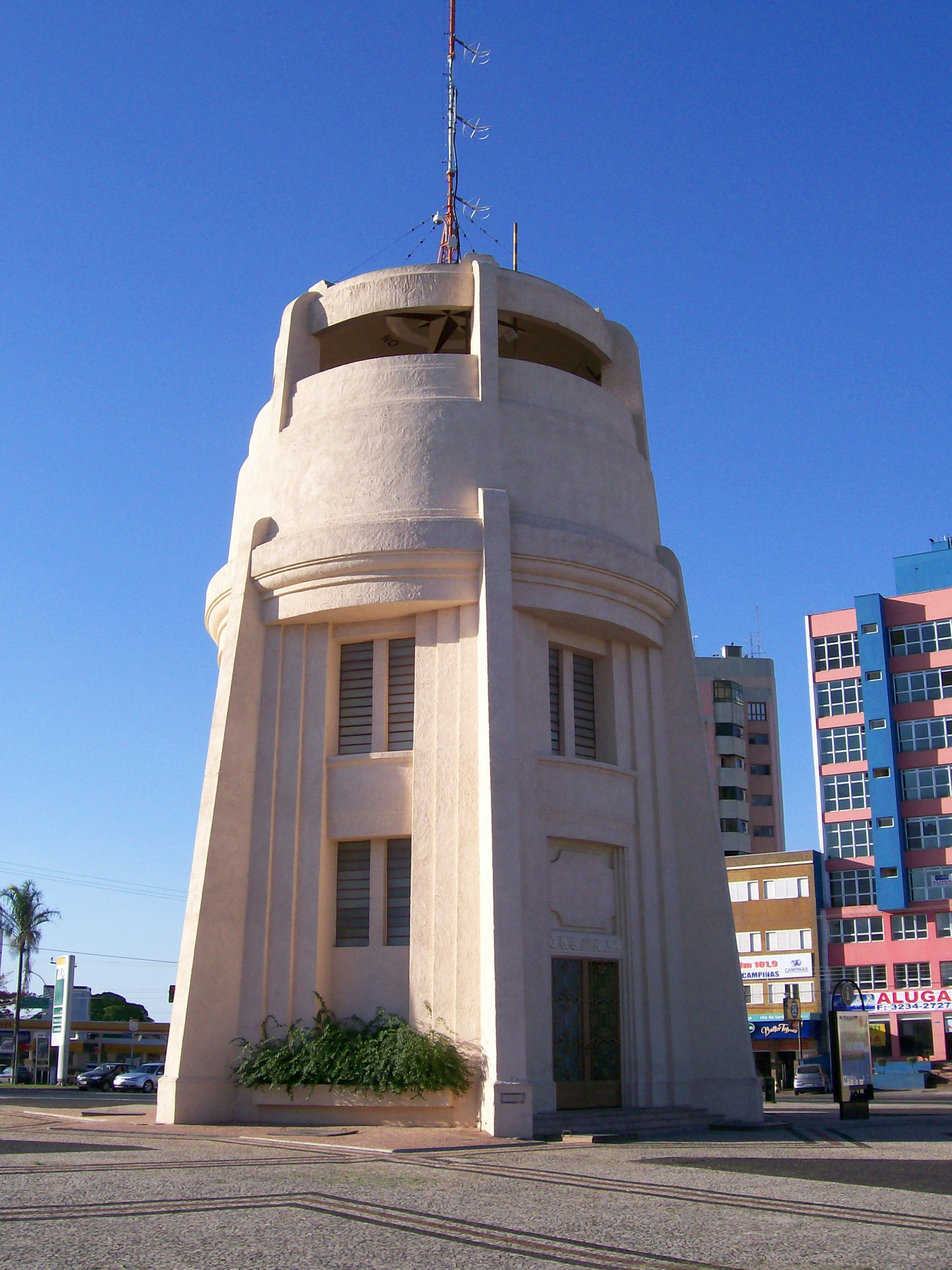
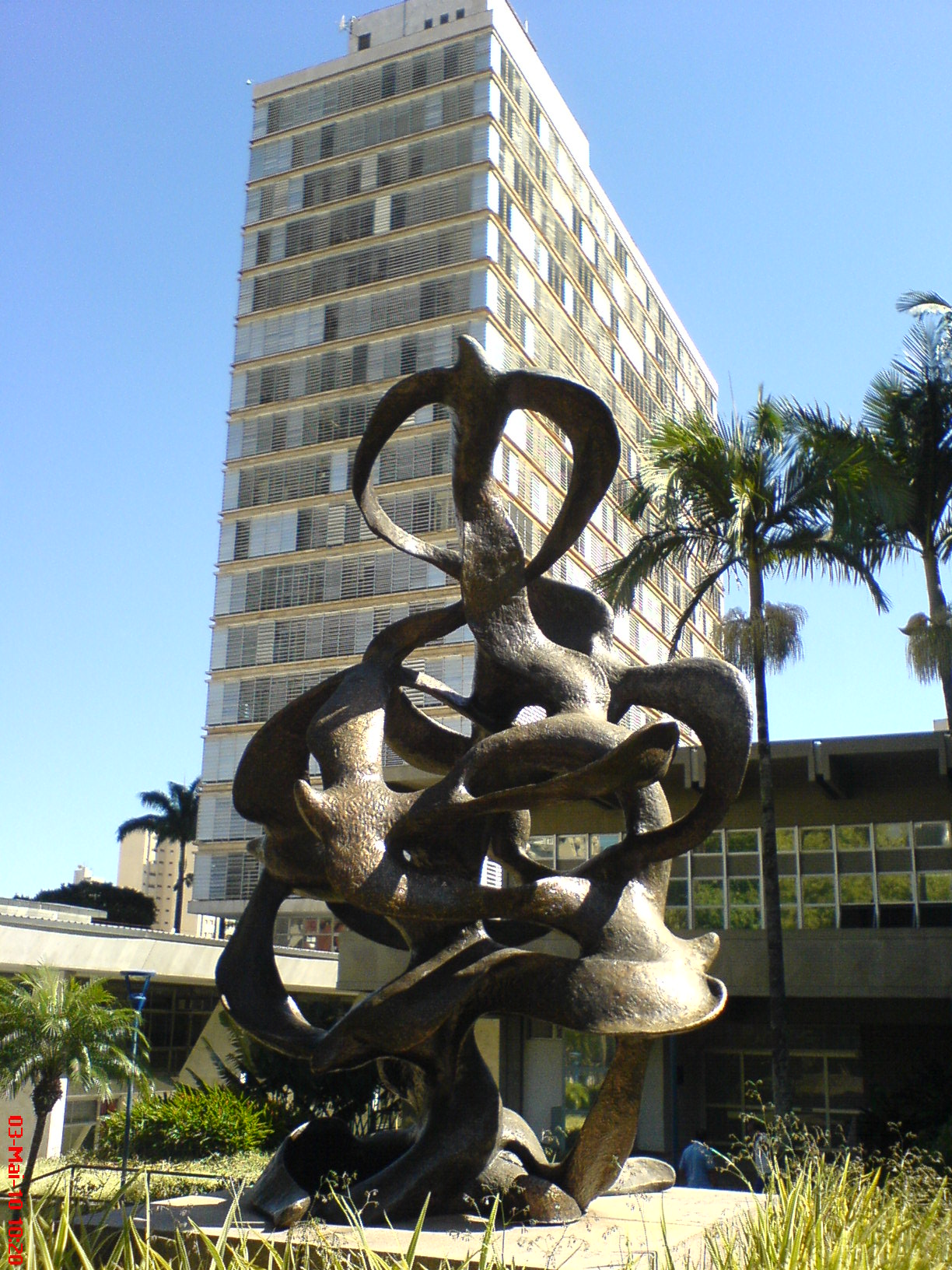
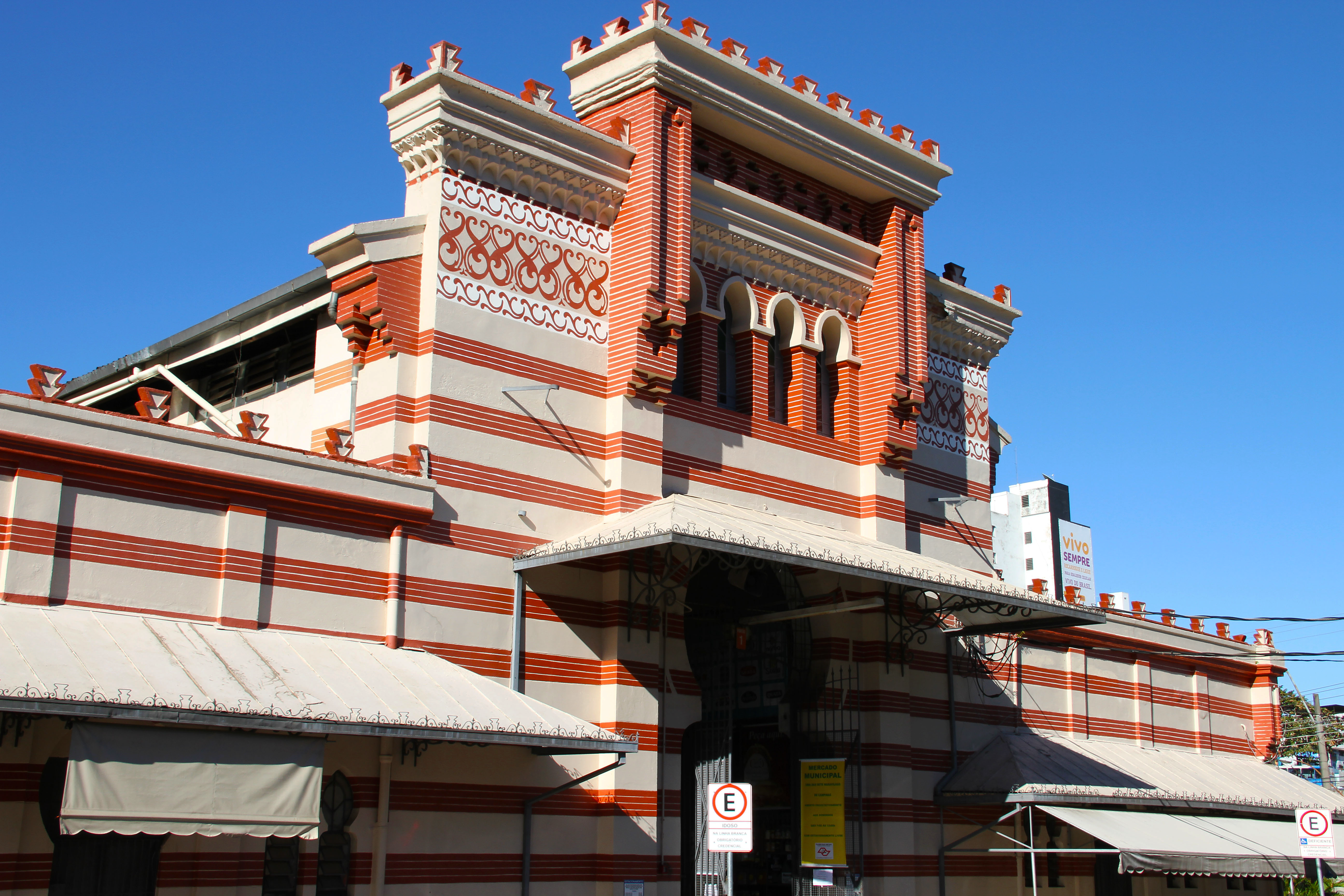
- City center panorama Metropolitan Cathedral of Campinas Former central train station, now "Culture Station" center Arena Theater at the Community Cultural Center Castelo Tower, a lookout place in a former water tower Jequitibás Palace Municipal Market

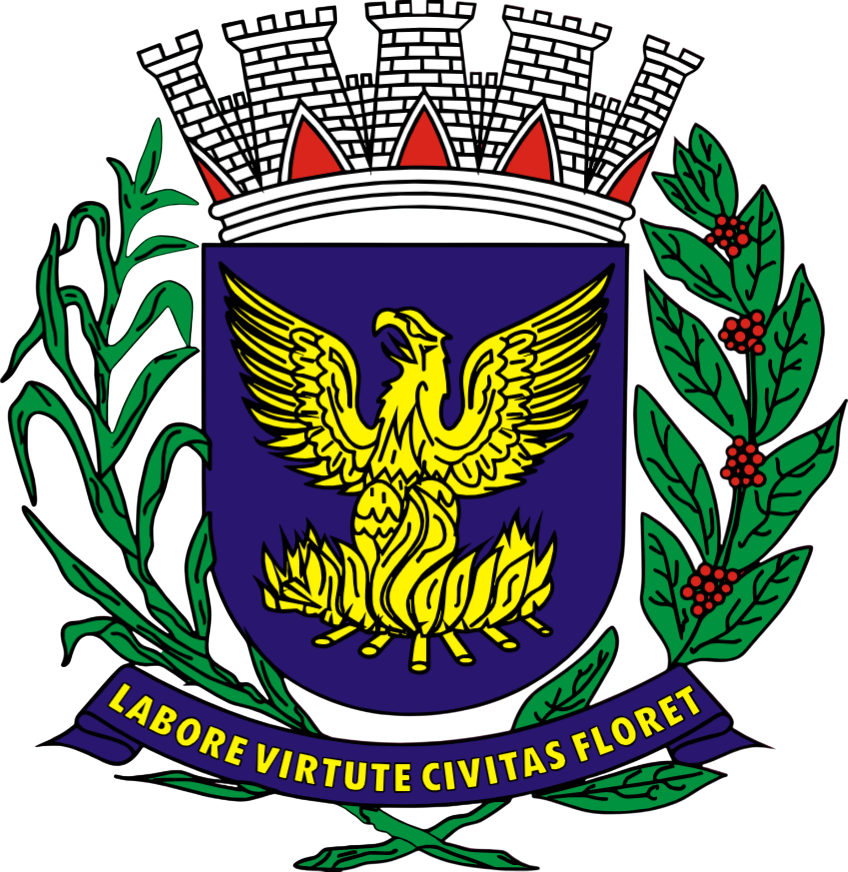
- Flag Coat of arms
- Nicknames: Cidade das Andorinhas; "Brazilian Silicon Valley; Princesa d'Oeste
- Motto: Labore Virtute Civitas Floret (Latin) "At work and virtue, the city flourishes"
- Location of Campinas

- Location in Brazil
- Coordinates: 22°54′21″S 47°03′39″W
- Country: Brazil
- Region: Southeast
- State: São Paulo
- Metropolitan Region: Campinas
- Founded: 14 July 1774; 252 years ago

Government
  - Mayor: Dário Saadi (Republicanos)

Area
  - Municipality: 795.667 km^{2} (307.209 sq mi)
  - Metro: 3,645 km^{2} (1,407 sq mi)
- Elevation: 555–780 m (1,821–2,559 ft)

Population (2025)
  - Municipality: 1,187,974 (14th)
  - Density: 1,433/km^{2} (3,710/sq mi)
  - Urban: 2,184,952
  - Metro: 3,491,150
  - Metro density: 1,003/km^{2} (2,600/sq mi)

GDP
  - Total: R$72.9 billion (US$13.1 billion) (2021)
- Time zone: UTC-3 (Brasilia Official Time)
- Postal Code: 13000-000
- Area code: +55 19
- HDI (2010): 0.805 – very high
- Website: www.campinas.sp.gov.br

Campinas (/kæmˈpiːnəs/ kam-PEE-nəs; Brazilian Portuguese: [kɐ̃ˈpinɐs]; lit. 'Plains, Meadows') is a city in the Brazilian state of São Paulo, located 84 kilometers northwest of the city of São Paulo. As of 2024, the city's population is estimated at 1,185,977, making it the fourteenth most populous Brazilian city and the third most populous in São Paulo state. The city's metropolitan area encompasses twenty municipalities with a total population of 3,491,150 people.

== Etymology ==
Campinas means meadows or grasslands in Portuguese and refers to its characteristic landscape, which originally comprised large stretches of dense subtropical forests (mato grosso or thick woods in Portuguese), mainly along the many rivers, interspersed with gently rolling hills covered by low-lying vegetation.

Campinas' official crest and flag has a picture of the mythical bird, the phoenix, because it was practically reborn after a devastating epidemic of yellow fever in the 1800s, which killed more than 25% of the city's inhabitants.

== History ==
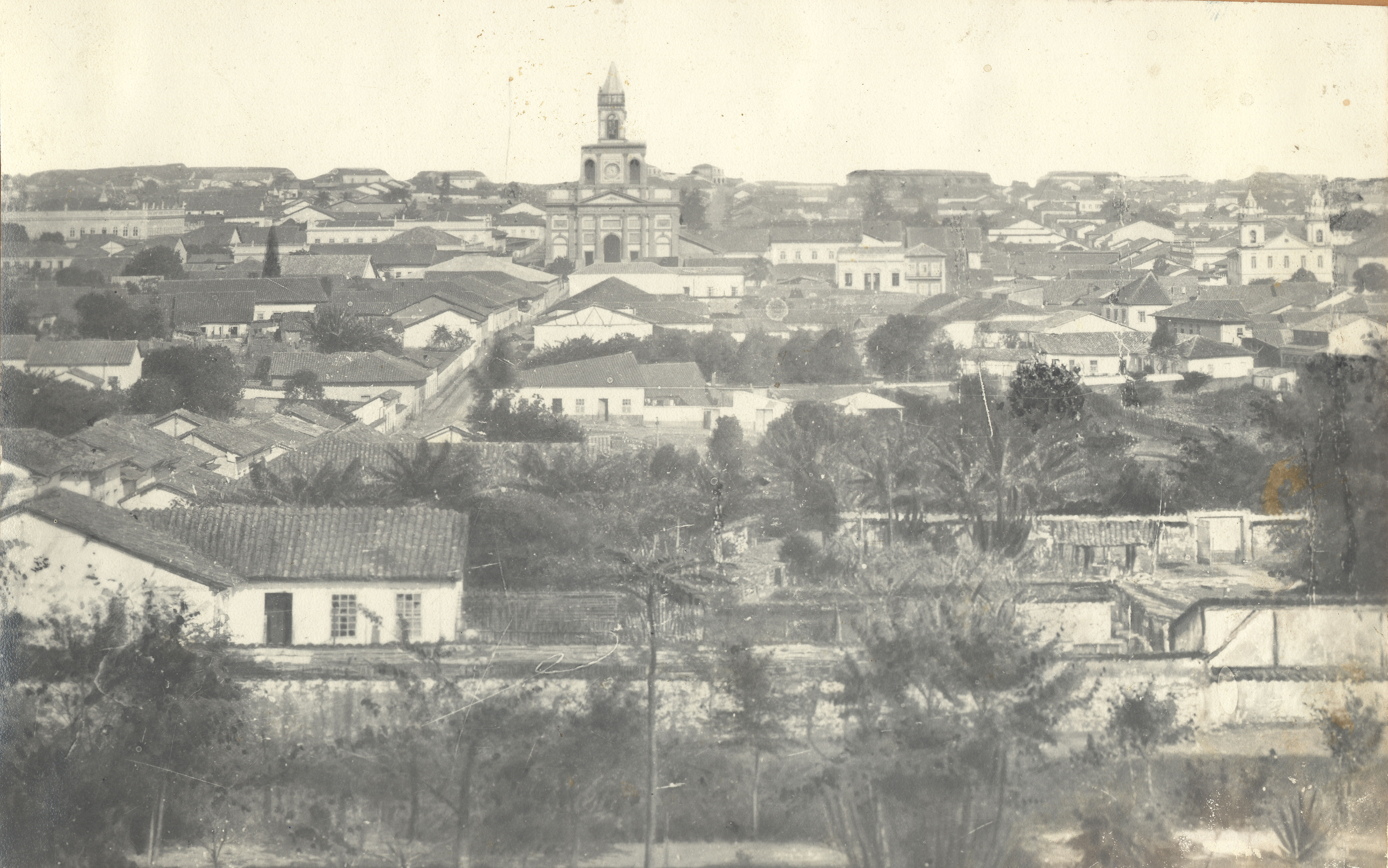
Campinas in 1878 during the Empire of Brazil.

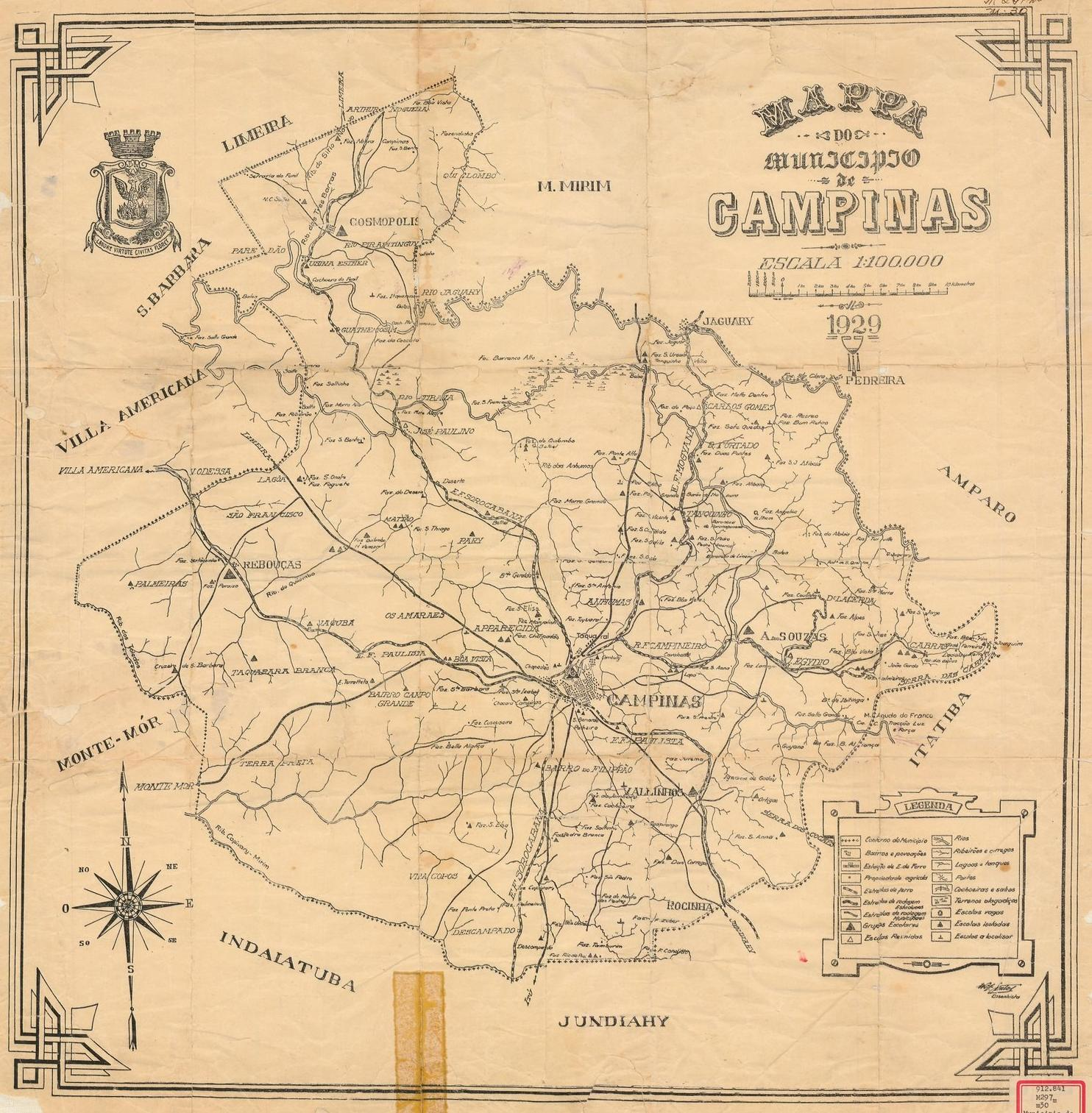
Maps of railways in Campinas in 1929

The city was founded on July 14, 1774, by Barreto Leme. It was initially a simple outpost on the way to Minas Gerais and Goiás serving the "Bandeirantes" who were in search of precious minerals and Indian slaves. In the first half of the 19th century, Campinas became a growing population center, with many coffee, cotton and sugarcane farms.

The construction of a railway linking the city of São Paulo to Santos' seaport, in 1867, was very important for its growth. In the second half of the 19th century, with the abolition of slavery, farming and industrialization attracted many foreign immigrants to replace the lost manpower, mainly from Italy.

Coffee became an important export and the city became wealthy. In consequence, a large service sector was established to serve the growing population, and in the first decades of the 20th century, Campinas could already boast of an opera house, theaters, banks, movie theaters, radio stations, a philharmonic orchestra, two newspapers (Correio Popular and Diário do Povo), a good public education system (with the Escola Normal de Campinas and the Colégio Culto à Ciência), and hospitals such as Santa Casa de Misericórdia (a charity for poor people) and Casa de Saúde de Campinas (for the Italian community, formerly known as Circolo Italiani Uniti), and Instituto Agronômico de Campinas, the Brazilian research center in agricultural sciences which was founded by Emperor Pedro II. Finally, the construction in 1938 of Anhanguera Highway between Campinas and São Paulo - the first Brazilian highway, was a turning point in the integration of Campinas into the rest of the state.

Campinas was the birthplace of opera composer Carlos Gomes (1836 — 1896) and of President of the Republic Campos Salles (1841 — 1913). For 49 years it was home to Hércules Florence, reputed as one of the early inventors of photography, photocopying and the mimeograph.

== Geography ==
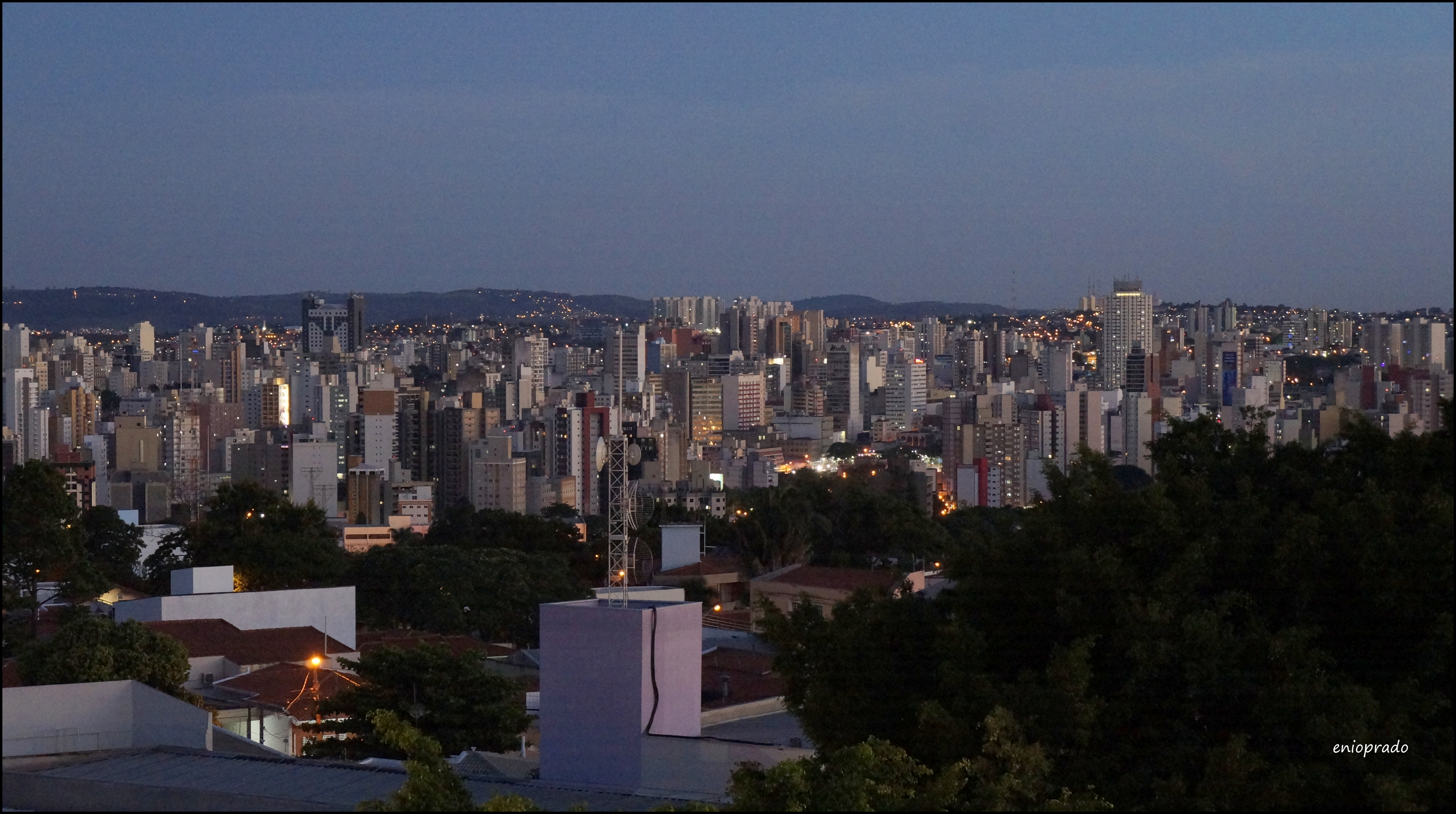
View of Campinas at dusk.

According to the Brazilian Institute of Geography and Statistics the area of the municipality is 795.697 square kilometres (307.220 square miles), 238.3230 square kilometres (92.017 square miles) of which urban area. It is located at 22°54′21″S, 47°03′39″W and is at a distance of 96 kilometres (60 miles) northwest of São Paulo. Its neighboring cities are Paulínia, Jaguariúna and Pedreira, north; Morungaba, Itatiba and Valinhos in the east; Itupeva, Indaiatuba and Monte Mor, south, and Hortolândia in the west.

=== Ecology ===
Most of the original vegetation of the city was largely eliminated. Like 13 other municipalities in the metropolitan region of Campinas, the city is subject to some environmental stress, and Campinas is considered one of the areas liable to flooding and silting; it now has less than 5% of vegetation cover in total area.

Trying to reverse this situation, several projects have been and are being conducted and planned, such as building corridors, and the regulation of the Management Plan of Environmental Preservation Area (APA) in Campinas. There are also several environmental projects to combat the destruction of riparian forests located along the banks of the Atibaia river, which has a high level of pollution. Today, Campinas houses the area of relevant ecological interest (ARIE) Mata de Santa Genebra, 251 acres (1.02 km^{2}), established in 1985 by the city of Campinas' Fundação José Pedro de Oliveira and regulated by the Brazilian Environment and Renewable Natural Resources Institute (IBAMA). This is the now second-largest urban forest of Brazil, behind only the Tijuca Forest, in Rio de Janeiro.

The city also has smaller urban forest groves and reserve parks, such as Bosque dos Jequitibas (installed in 1881), Bosque dos Italianos (lit. 'Italian's Groove'), Bosque dos Alemães (lit. 'German's Groove'), Parque dos Guarantãs, as well as the larger Parque Portugal (best known locally as Lagoa do Taquaral - lit. 'Bamboo Grove Lagoon'), Parque Ecológico Monsenhor "Emílio José Salim" and Parque Ecológico "Dom Bosco".

=== Climate ===
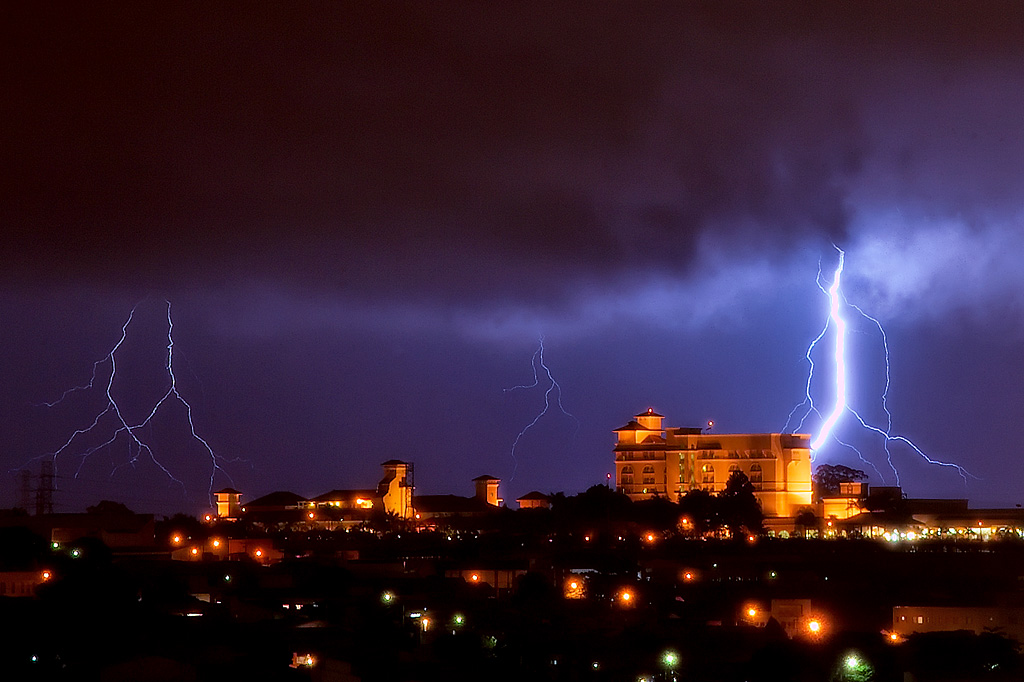
View of Campinas during a storm.

The city has a tropical savanna climate (Aw in Köppen scheme). It was humid subtropical (Cwa type in the Köppen classification) before the current climatic table (1981-2010 period).

Winters are generally dry and mild (rarely too cold), and summers rainy with warm to hot temperatures. The warmest month is February, with an average temperature of 24 °C, an average maximum of 29.1 °C and average minimum of 19.0 °C. The coldest month, July, sees respective temperatures of 17.8 °C, and 24.2 °C and 11.4 °C average maximum and minimum. Fall and spring are transitional seasons.

The average annual rainfall is 1424.5 mm and the driest month in August, when there is only 22.9 mm. In January, the rainiest month, the average is 280.3 mm. In recent years, however, the hot, dry days during the winter have been increasingly frequent, often surpassing 30 °C, especially between July and September. In August 2010, for example, the rainfall in Campinas was only 0 mm. During the dry season and long dry spells in the middle of the rainy season are also common records of fires in the hills and thickets, especially in rural areas of the city, which contributes to deforestation and the release of pollutants into the atmosphere, further worsening air quality. The lowest temperature recorded in the city was −1.5 °C on June 25, 1918. The highest temperature was 39.0 °C, observed on 17 November 1985. The highest cumulative rainfall recorded in 24 hours in the city between June 1988 and October 2008 was 143.4 mm in 25 days May 2005. Between 1890 and 2004 there were 41 occurrences of frost in Campinas. The most recent was on June 31, 2025, when the minimum temperature reached 1.8 °C. There are also occasional episodes of strong winds, with gusts exceeding 100 km / h, and training records were made in the city day May 4, 2001 and March 9, 2008.

The wet season is from mid-October to mid-April, with heavier rains particularly in December, January, February and early March, and the dry season is from mid-May to mid-September. Average rainfall is 24.3 mm in August and 267.8 mm in January. Average humidity ranges from 37% (August) to 56% (January).

In the region around Campinas near the state of Minas Gerais there are a number of cities which enjoy an even milder mountain climate, such as Serra Negra, Socorro, Lindóia and Águas de Lindoia, where several water spas are located.

Climate data for Campinas, elevation 667 m (2,188 ft), (1993–2020 normals, extremes 1890–2012)
Month	Jan	Feb	Mar	Apr	May	Jun	Jul	Aug	Sep	Oct	Nov	Dec	Year
Record high °C (°F)	36.1 (97.0)	35.8 (96.4)	34.5 (94.1)	33.6 (92.5)	32.4 (90.3)	30.0 (86.0)	31.2 (88.2)	35.0 (95.0)	37.8 (100.0)	37.8 (100.0)	37.8 (100.0)	36.8 (98.2)	37.8 (100.0)
Mean daily maximum °C (°F)	29.5 (85.1)	29.9 (85.8)	29.5 (85.1)	28.3 (82.9)	25.3 (77.5)	24.7 (76.5)	25.1 (77.2)	26.9 (80.4)	28.3 (82.9)	29.3 (84.7)	29.1 (84.4)	29.7 (85.5)	28.0 (82.3)
Daily mean °C (°F)	24.6 (76.3)	24.8 (76.6)	24.3 (75.7)	22.8 (73.0)	19.7 (67.5)	18.8 (65.8)	18.8 (65.8)	20.3 (68.5)	22.0 (71.6)	23.5 (74.3)	23.7 (74.7)	24.5 (76.1)	22.3 (72.2)
Mean daily minimum °C (°F)	19.6 (67.3)	19.6 (67.3)	19.1 (66.4)	17.3 (63.1)	14.2 (57.6)	12.9 (55.2)	12.5 (54.5)	13.6 (56.5)	15.8 (60.4)	17.6 (63.7)	18.2 (64.8)	19.3 (66.7)	16.6 (62.0)
Record low °C (°F)	10.1 (50.2)	10.4 (50.7)	10.0 (50.0)	3.8 (38.8)	0.2 (32.4)	−1.5 (29.3)	−0.2 (31.6)	0.2 (32.4)	1.8 (35.2)	5.2 (41.4)	8.0 (46.4)	9.5 (49.1)	−1.5 (29.3)
Average precipitation mm (inches)	266.6 (10.50)	188.4 (7.42)	157.5 (6.20)	64.1 (2.52)	62.3 (2.45)	48.6 (1.91)	33.3 (1.31)	27.2 (1.07)	59.5 (2.34)	103.8 (4.09)	154.4 (6.08)	207.6 (8.17)	1,373.3 (54.06)
Average precipitation days (≥ 1.0 mm)	18.4	15.0	12.6	6.6	5.7	5.2	3.9	3.7	7.1	10.5	12.5	15.3	116.5
Source 1: Centro Integrado de Informações Agrometeorológicas
Source 2: IAC – Instituto Agronômico de Campinas/CEPAGRI-UNICAMP (extremes)

== Demographics ==
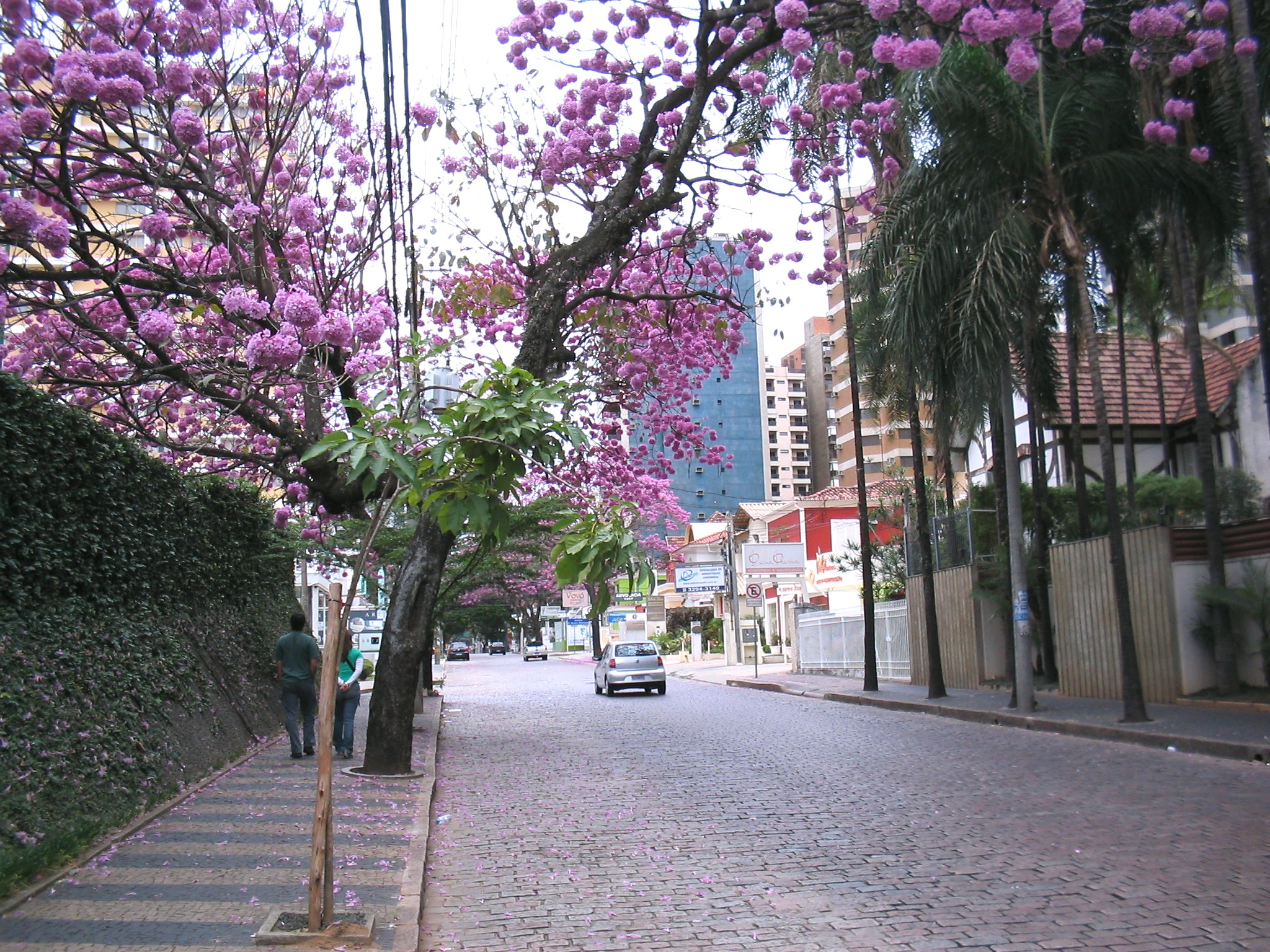
Coronel Quirino Street in the upper-class residential area of Cambuí.

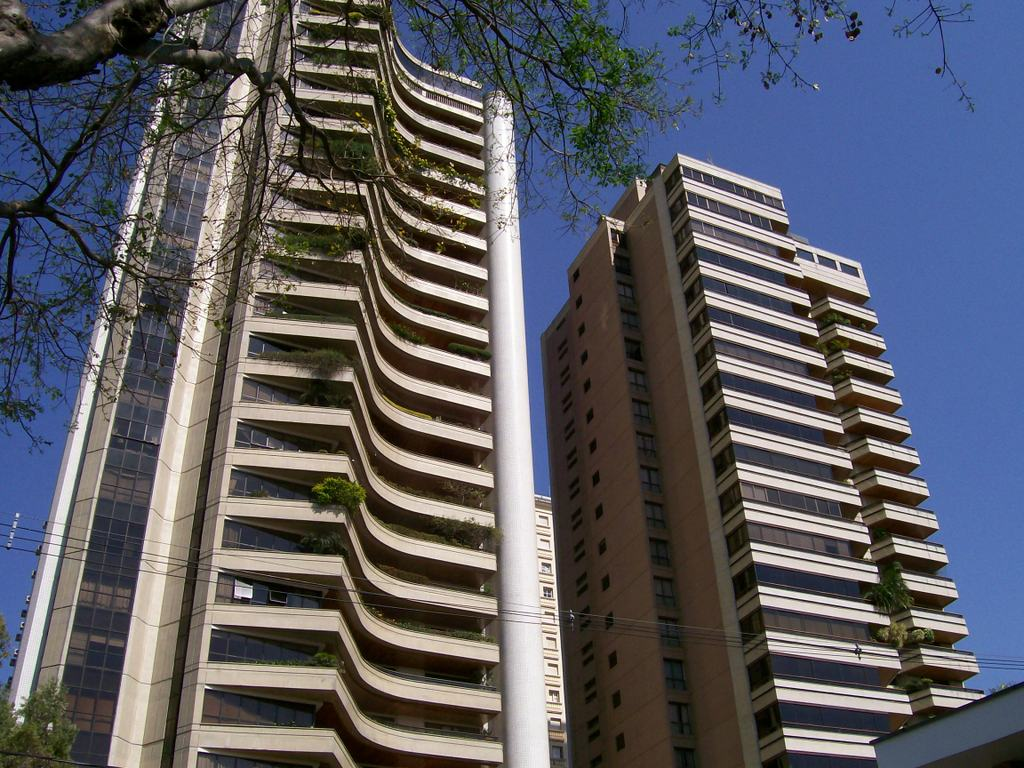
Luxury condos at Cambuí, a wealthy neighbourhood of Campinas.

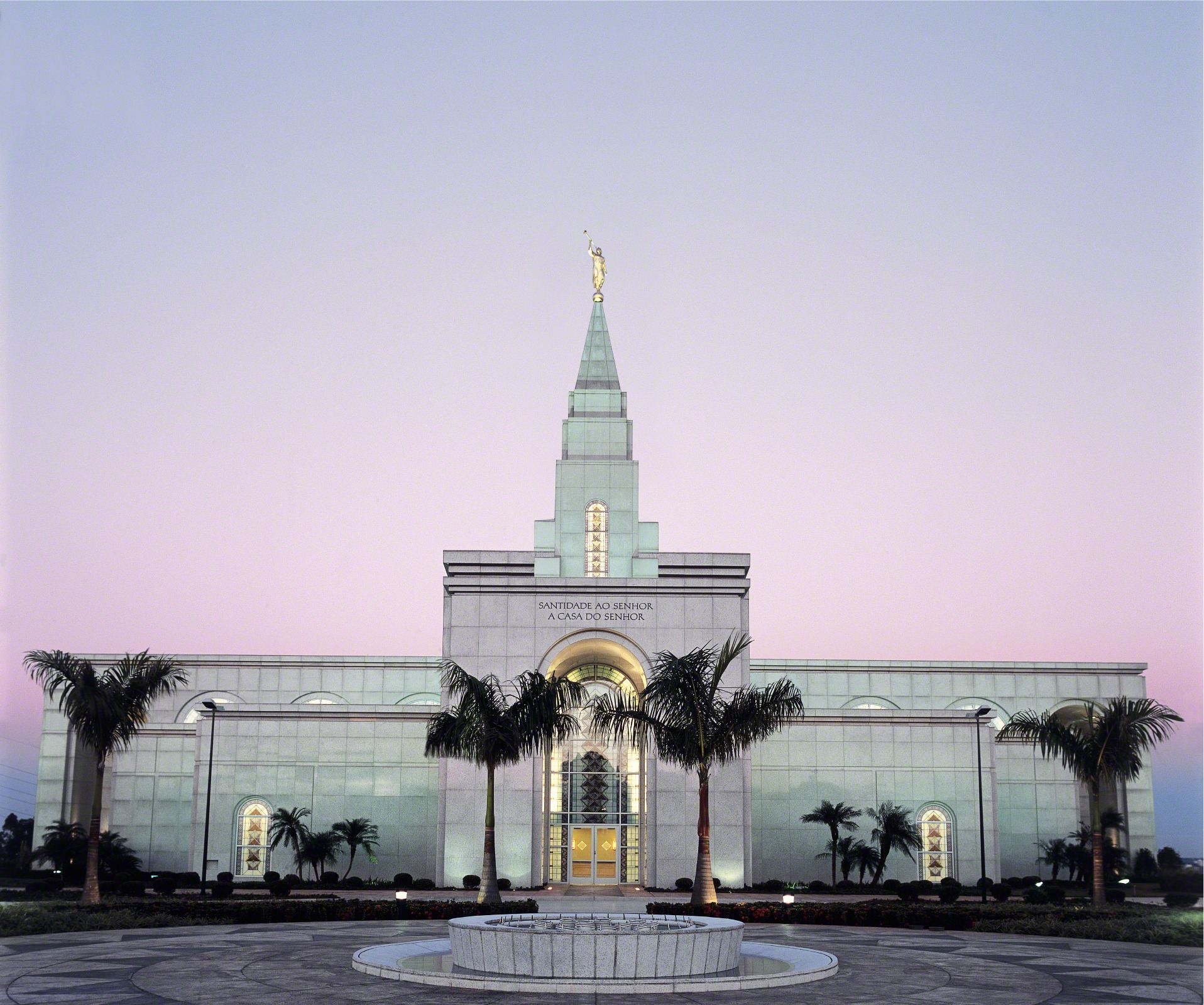
Campinas Brazil Temple of the Church of Jesus Christ of Latter-day Saints located in the city.

Historical population (municipality)
Year	Population	%±
1920	115,602
1940	129,940	12.4%
1950	152,547	17.4%
1960	219,303	43.8%
1970	375,864	71.4%
1980	664,566	76.8%
1991	847,595	27.5%
2000	969,396	14.4%
2010	1,080,113	11.4%
2022	1,139,047	5.5%

According to the 2022 Census, as of August 2022, Campinas had a population of 1,139,047 and a population density of 1.433,54 (inhabitants / km ²). Infant mortality levels were at up to 1 year (per thousand): 14.05 and life expectancy in the city was 72.22 years. The fertility rate was at 1.78 children per woman. 96.01 of the populace could read.

- Human Development Index (HDI-M): 0.852 (high)
- HDI-M Income: 0.845 (high)
- HDI-M Longevity: 0.787
- HDI-M Education: 0.925 (very high)

(Source: DATA)

=== Ethnicity ===
Source: 2022 census:

Color / Race	Percentage
White	59.5%
Pardo	30.1%
Black	9.2%
Asian	1.0%
Indigenous	0.1%

=== Composition ===
Source: 2022 Census Population (IBGE): 1,139,047

Population	% / inhabitants
Urban area	98,28% / 1,062,453
Rural area	1,72% / 18,546

Sex	% / inhabitants
Male	48,22% / 521,209
Female	51,78% / 559,790

=== Metropolitan region ===
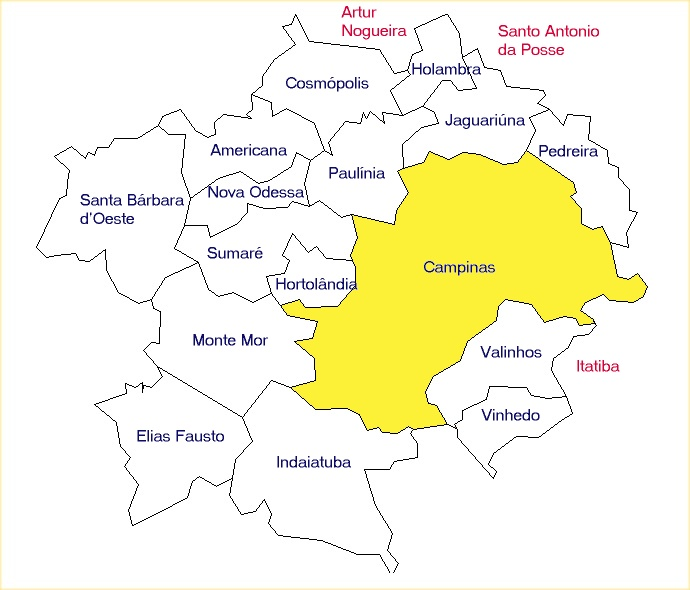
Administrative micro-region of Campinas. The outlying municipality names in red are also part of the Metropolitan Region of Campinas.

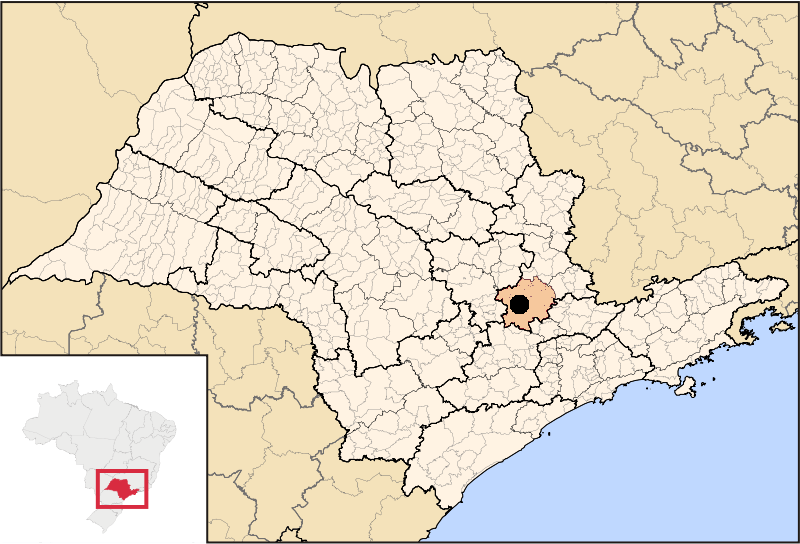
Metropolitan Region of Campinas.

As of 2010, Campinas became an official metropolitan region (RMC — Região Metropolitana de Campinas), with 19 municipalities, with a total of 2.8 million inhabitants and a total land area of 3,348 square kilometres (1,293 square miles) (data as of 2010), adjacent to the São Paulo metropolitan region (RMSP) and São José dos Campos (RMVale). The Campinas Metropolitan area also comprehends a gross domestic product (GDP) of R$70.7 billion (around U$42 billion).

- Americana
- Artur Nogueira
- Cosmópolis
- Engenheiro Coelho
- Holambra
- Hortolândia
- Indaiatuba
- Itatiba
- Jaguariúna
- Monte Mor
- Nova Odessa
- Paulínia
- Pedreira
- Santa Bárbara d'Oeste
- Santo Antônio de Posse
- Sumaré
- Valinhos
- Vinhedo

The Campinas municipality is also the administrative center of the micro- and meso-regions of the same name. The micro-region includes the RMC (Metropolitan Region of Campinas) and the municipality of Elias Fausto; the meso-region also includes the following municipalities: Aguaí, Amparo, Águas da Prata, Águas de Lindóia, Caconde, Casa Branca, Divinolândia, Espírito Santo do Pinhal, Estiva Gerbi, Itapira, Itobi, Lindóia, Mococa, Mogi Guaçu, Moji-Mirim, Monte Alegre do Sul, Pedra Bela, Pinhalzinho, Pirassununga, Porto Ferreira, Santa Cruz das Palmeiras, Santo Antônio do Jardim, São João da Boa Vista, São José do Rio Pardo, São Sebastião da Grama, Serra Negra, Socorro, Tambaú, Tapiratiba, Vargem Grande do Sul and Vinhedo.

Other cities which are geographically, historically or economically tied to the meso-region of Campinas could be mentioned: Araras, Atibaia, Bragança Paulista, Capivari, Conchal, Iracemápolis, Itu, Itupeva, Jarinu, Jundiai, Limeira, Louveira, Mombuca, Morungaba, Piracicaba, Rafard, Rio das Pedras, Salto and Tuiuti.

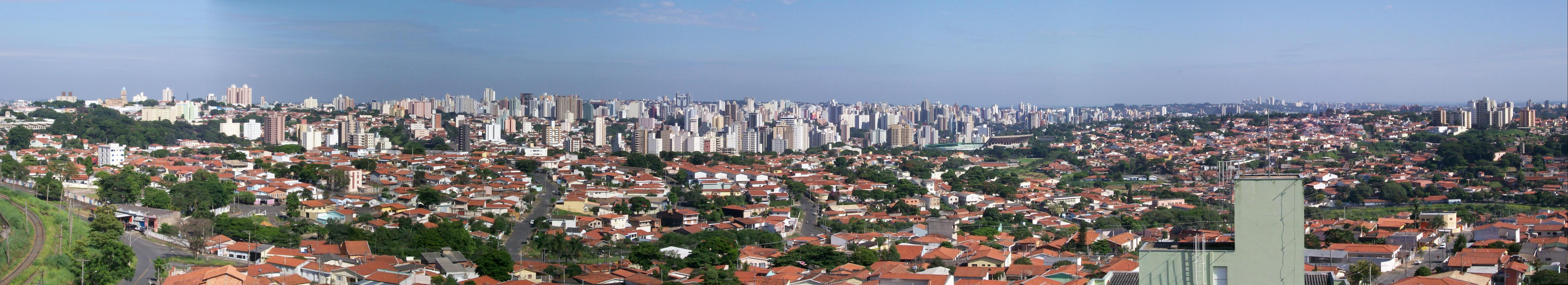
Campinas city view

== Economy ==
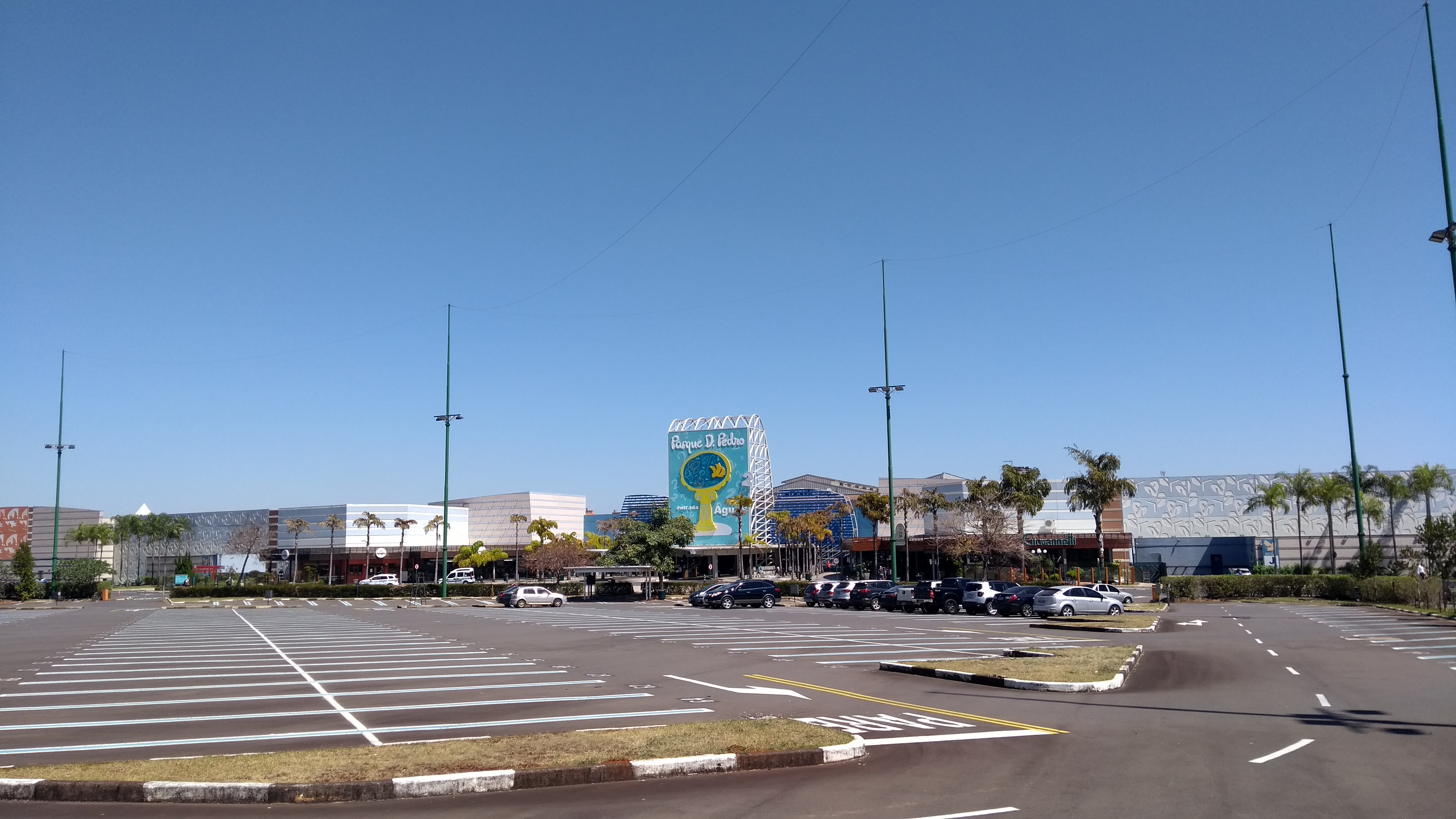
Parque Dom Pedro is the largest mall in Latin America.

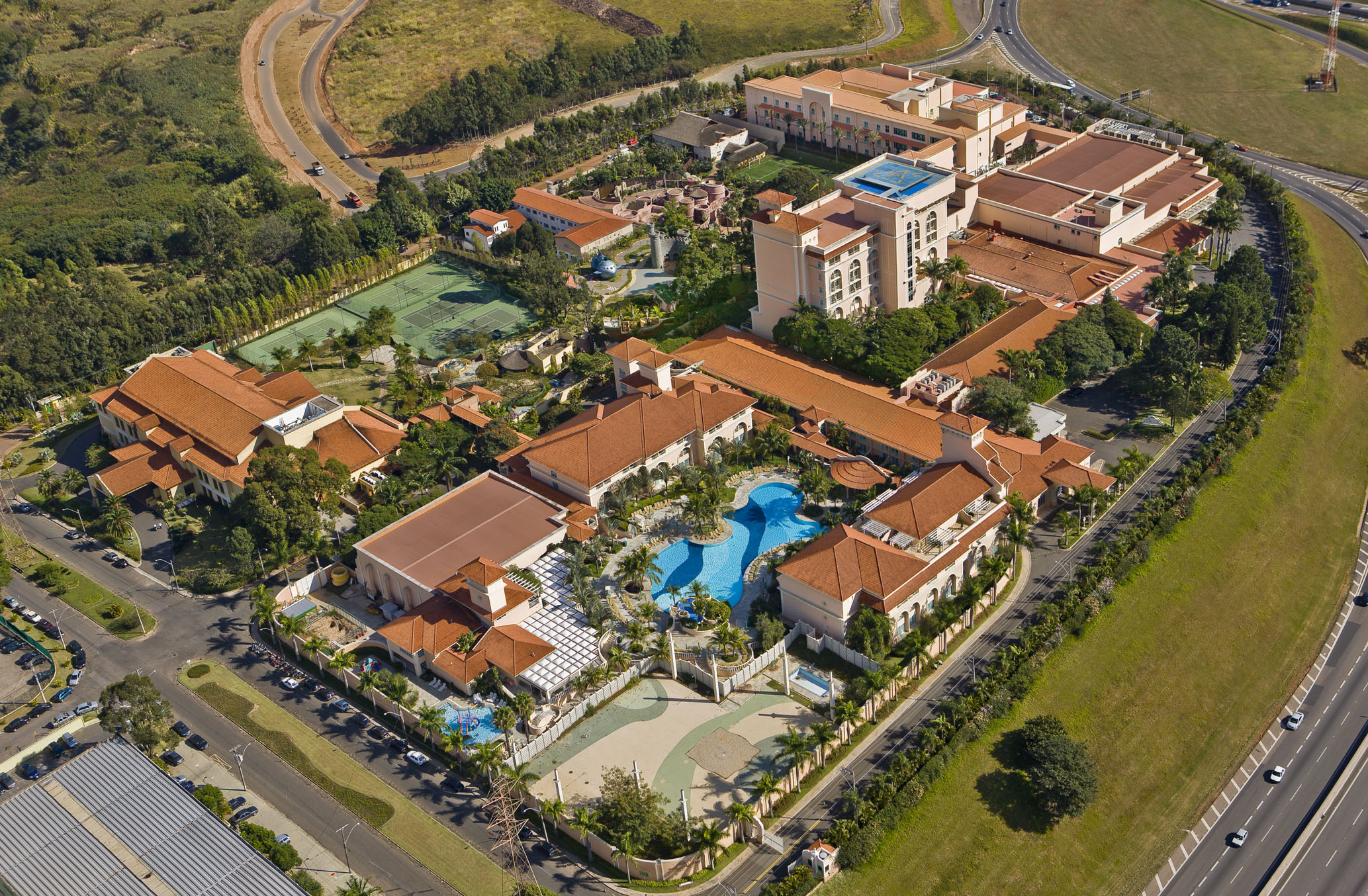
Royal Palm Convention Center and Resort.

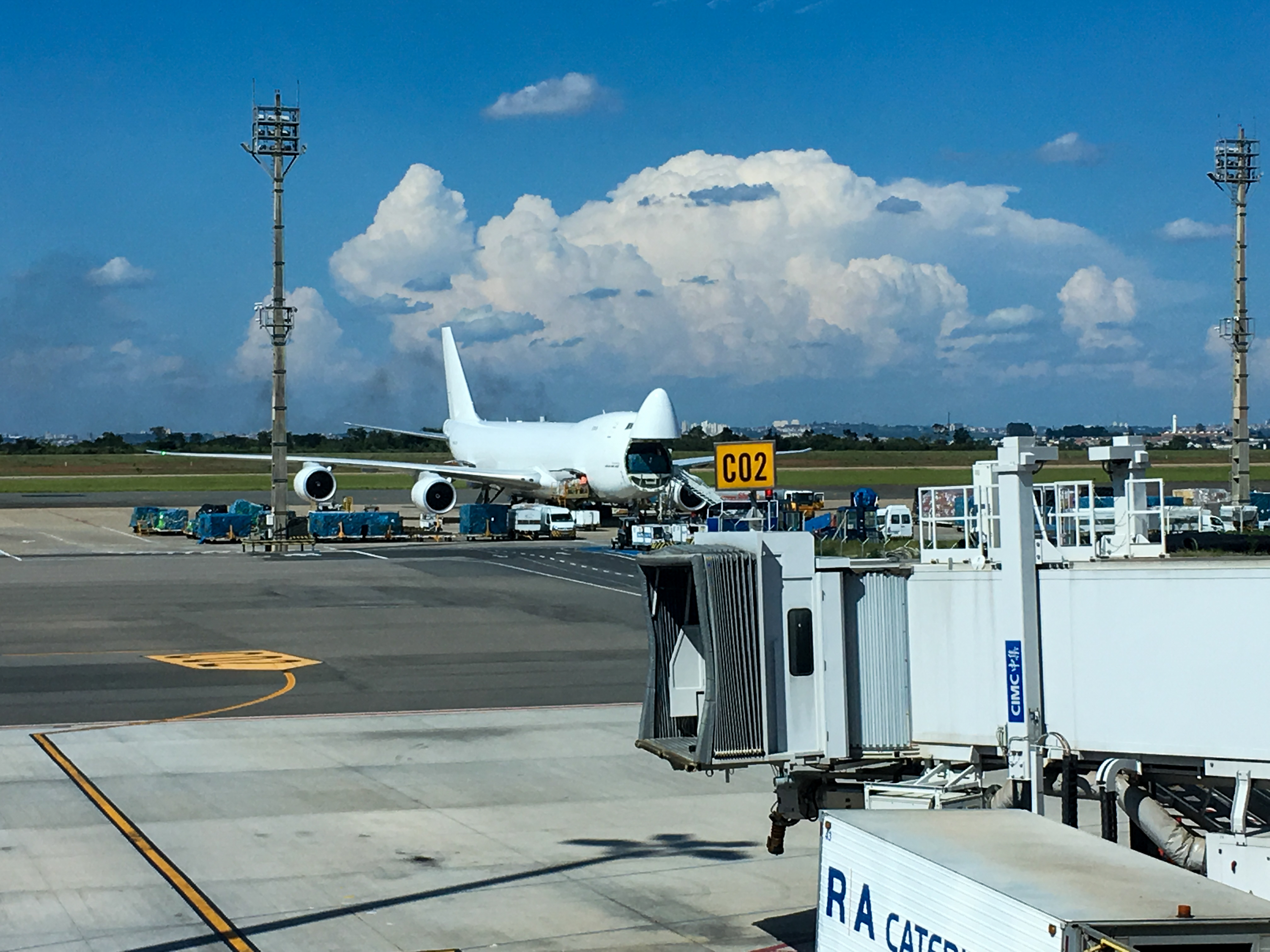
Cargo Terminal of Viracopos International Airport.

Campinas is the richest city in the metropolitan region of Campinas and the 10th richest city in Brazil, showing a gross domestic product (GDP) of 36.68 billion reais (2010), which represents almost 1% (0.998%) of all Brazilian GDP. Currently, the city concentrates 10% of industrial production of Brazil. The paper highlights the high-tech industries and metallurgical park, considered the capital of Silicon Valley Sterling.

The region hosts 17,677 industries, the second largest number in the State of São Paulo.

The petrochemical complex is centered in the Southeastern section, a few miles from Campinas, near the refinery of Petrobras Planalto Paulista (Replan), the largest in Brazil one of the largest in Latin America, and has companies like Dupont, Chevron, Shell, Exxon, Group Ipiranga, Eucatex, Rhodia, and others. It is the hub of companies and Blue Trip. The largest companies have a global turnover of more than $80 billion, larger than many Latin American countries.

The city has several shopping malls, two of the largest being Iguatemi Campinas and Shopping Parque Dom Pedro. Campinas has, within its metropolitan area, the largest cargo airport for import/export, Viracopos International Airport, a significant entity in the international transport of cargo.

Campinas' main economic activities are agriculture (mainly coffee, sugarcane, and cotton), industry (textiles, motorcycles, cars, machinery, agricultural equipment, food and beverages, chemical and petrochemical, pharmaceuticals, paper and cellulose, telecommunications, computers and electronics, etc.), commerce and services.

The Campinas Metropolitan Region is home to many national and international high-tech industries and IT companies, including IBM, Dell, Motorola, NXP, Lucent, Nortel, Compaq, Celestica, Samsung, Alcatel, Bosch, 3M, Texas Instruments, CI&T and Daitan.

The airline TRIP Linhas Aéreas is headquartered in Campinas. The Viracopos airport is also the operational hub of Azul Airlines.

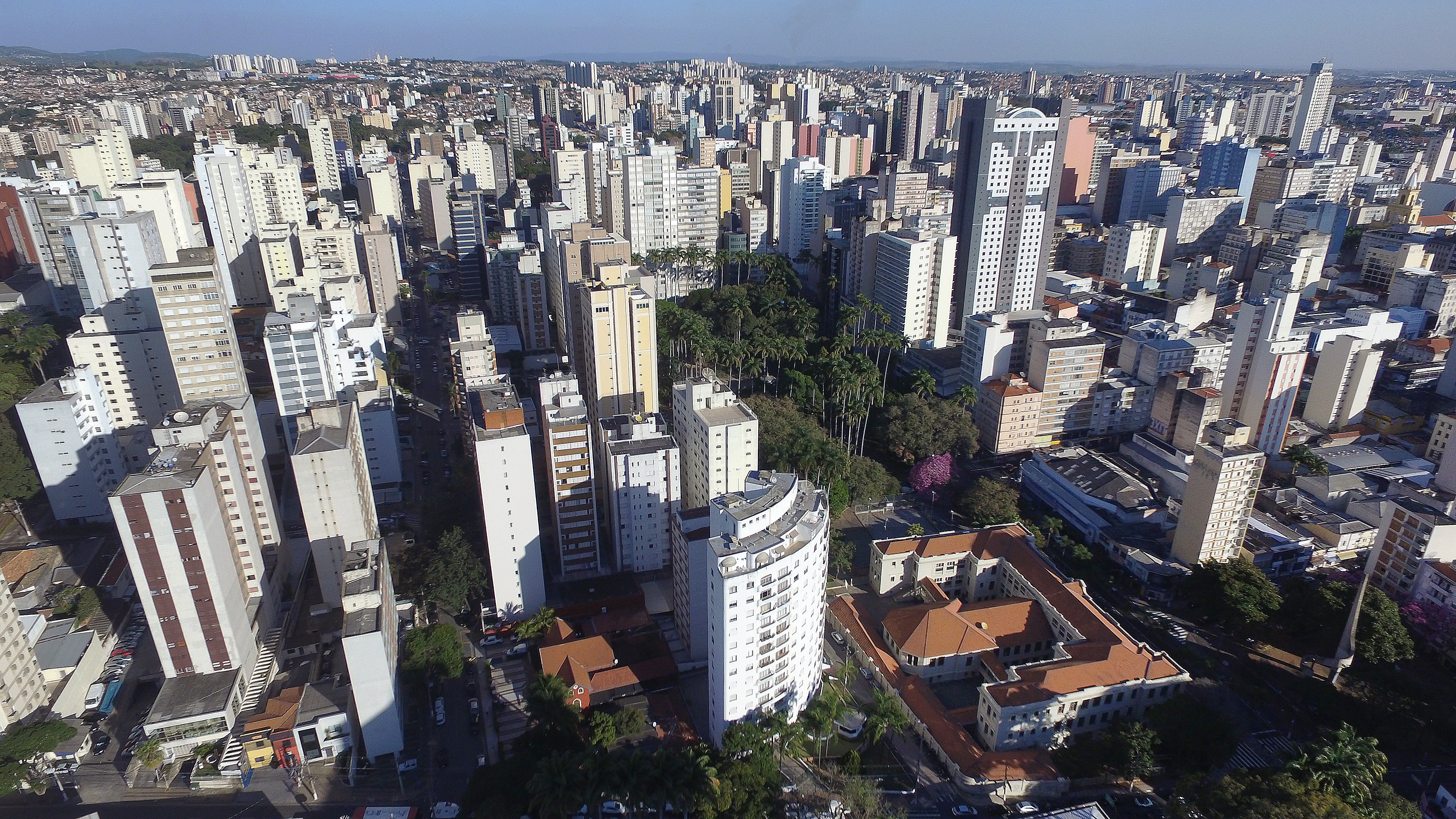
Downtown Campinas in 2017

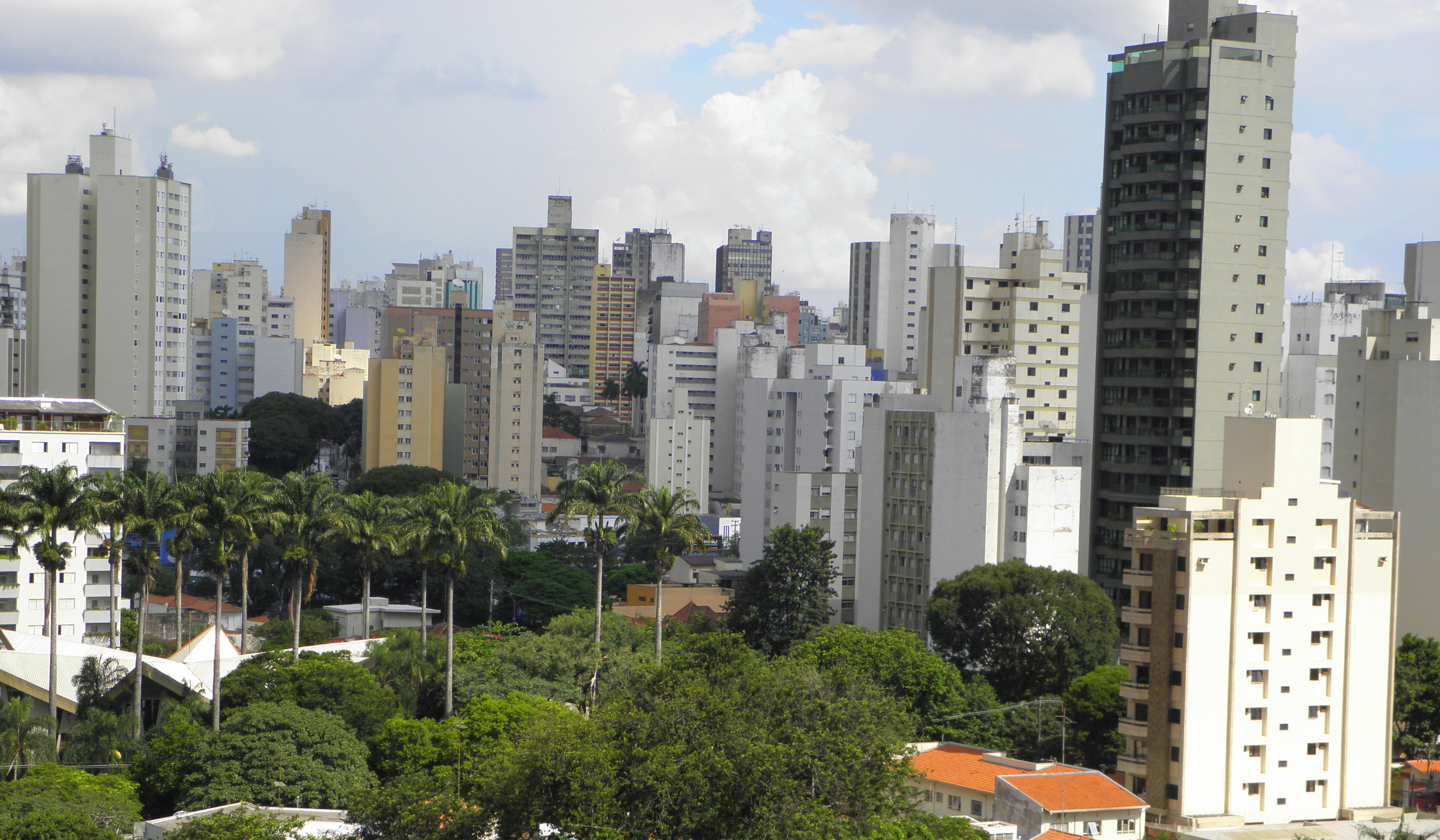
View of Campinas

The automotive industry is also heavily represented: General Motors, Mercedes-Benz, Honda, Magneti Marelli, Eaton Corporation, Tenneco, Toyota and many others are present. It also has a sizable pharmaceutical industry sector, with companies like Medley Farma, EMS Farma, Altana, Merck Sharp and Dohme, Cristália, Valeo, etc.

In addition the region is home to many research centers and universities, such as the Brazilian Synchrotron Light Laboratory, Brazilian Nanotechnology National Laboratory, National Laboratory of Science and Technology of Bioethanol, Brazilian Biosciences National Laboratory, Centro de Pesquisa e Desenvolvimento em Telecomunicações (CPqD), CenPRA, Embrapa, Unicamp, Facamp and Puccamp. According to the Times Higher Education 2007 World University Rankings, the University of Campinas (Unicamp) is the 177th best university in the world, and the 2nd best in Latin America (after the University of São Paulo in 176th place).

Campinas also boasts the largest number of high-tech business incubators and industrial parks (a total of eight), such as the CIATEC I and II, Softex, TechnoPark, InCamp, Polis, TechTown, Industrial Park of Campinas, and others.

The presence of one of the largest oil refineries in Latin America (350,824 barrels (55,776.6 m^{3}) of crude per day), operated by Petrobras in the neighboring county of Paulínia, has attracted many petrochemical companies to the Campinas area, including DuPont, Rhone-Poulenc, and Royal Dutch Shell.

The Brazilian Pró-Álcool Program was developed in Campinas: a whole industry based on the use of ethanol as a combustible for motor vehicles, going from a new sucrose-rich sugarcane, to alcohol refineries, a huge distribution system, and, most recently, an internal combustion engine capable of using either gasoline or ethanol.

Other examples of Campinas-bred technologies are fiber optics, lasers for telecommunications and medical applications, integrated circuits design and fabrication, satellite environmental monitoring of natural resources, software for agriculture, digital telephone switches, deep-water oil exploration platforms and technologies, biomedical equipment, medical software, genetic engineering and recombinant DNA technologies for food production and pharmaceutics, and food engineering. Because of this, Campinas has been called the Brazilian Silicon Valley.

== Tourism and recreation ==
Tourist attractions include:

- the Bosque dos Jequitibás, an urban preserved wooded area reminiscent of the original rain forest that covered the region in the past: it has a small zoo with local fauna and a natural history museum;
- the cathedral, which was built in the 19th century; its interior is entirely made of jacaranda wood sculptures and works. It was made using a technique called "taipa de pilão" using clay and rocks – it is one of the largest buildings in the world using this construction technique;
- the Central Market, with typical stall stands full of the fresh products of the region;
- the old Central Railway Station, now converted to a cultural center;
- Centro de Convivência, a cultural complex of theater, an open arena for concerts and spectacles, and a plaza where Campinas Symphony Orchestra often plays to the public, during on Sundays this place receive many art exhibitors known by most people as Prefeitura Municipal de Campinas Hippie Fair;

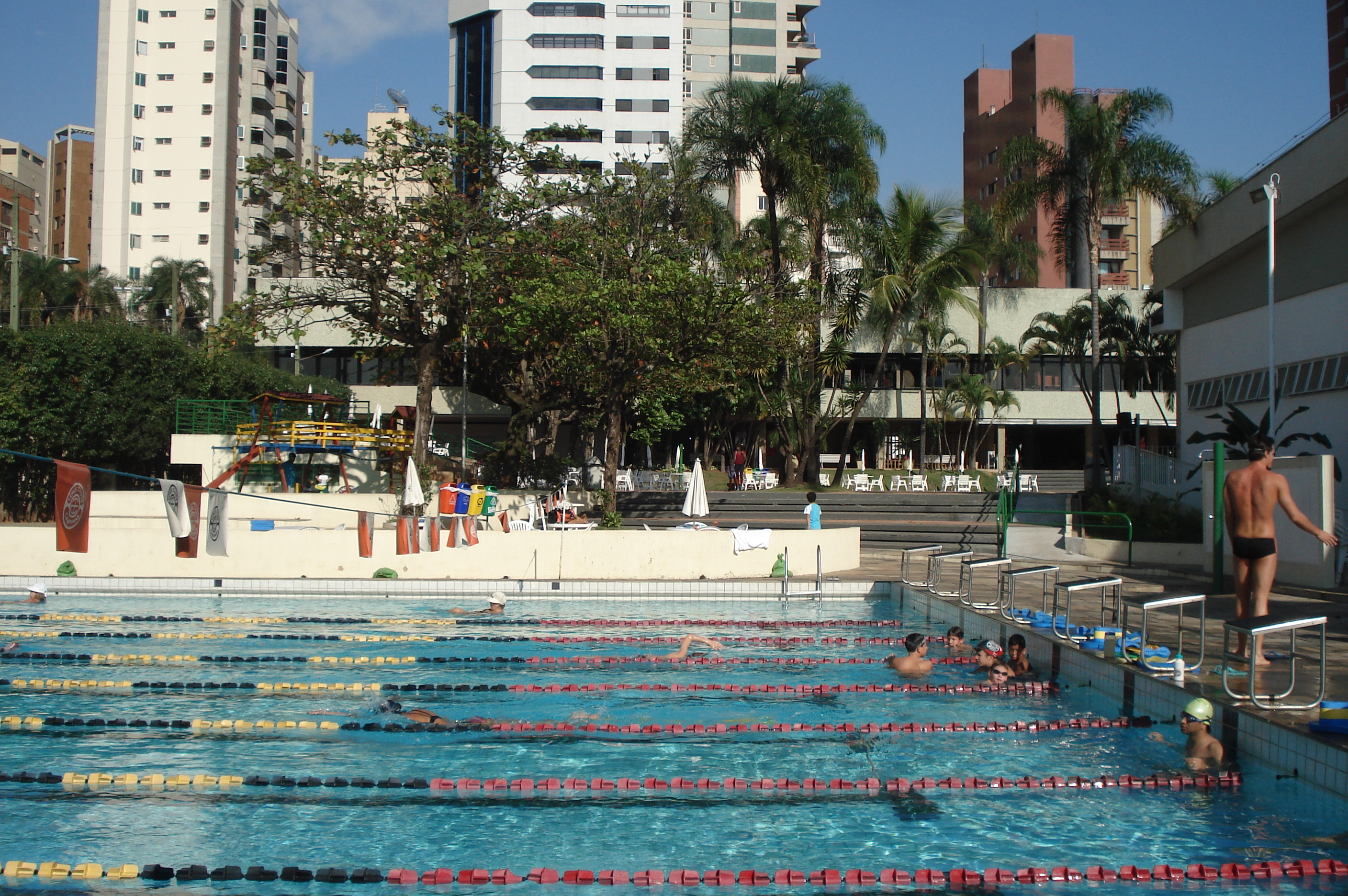
Swimming in the Tennis Club of Campinas (TCC).

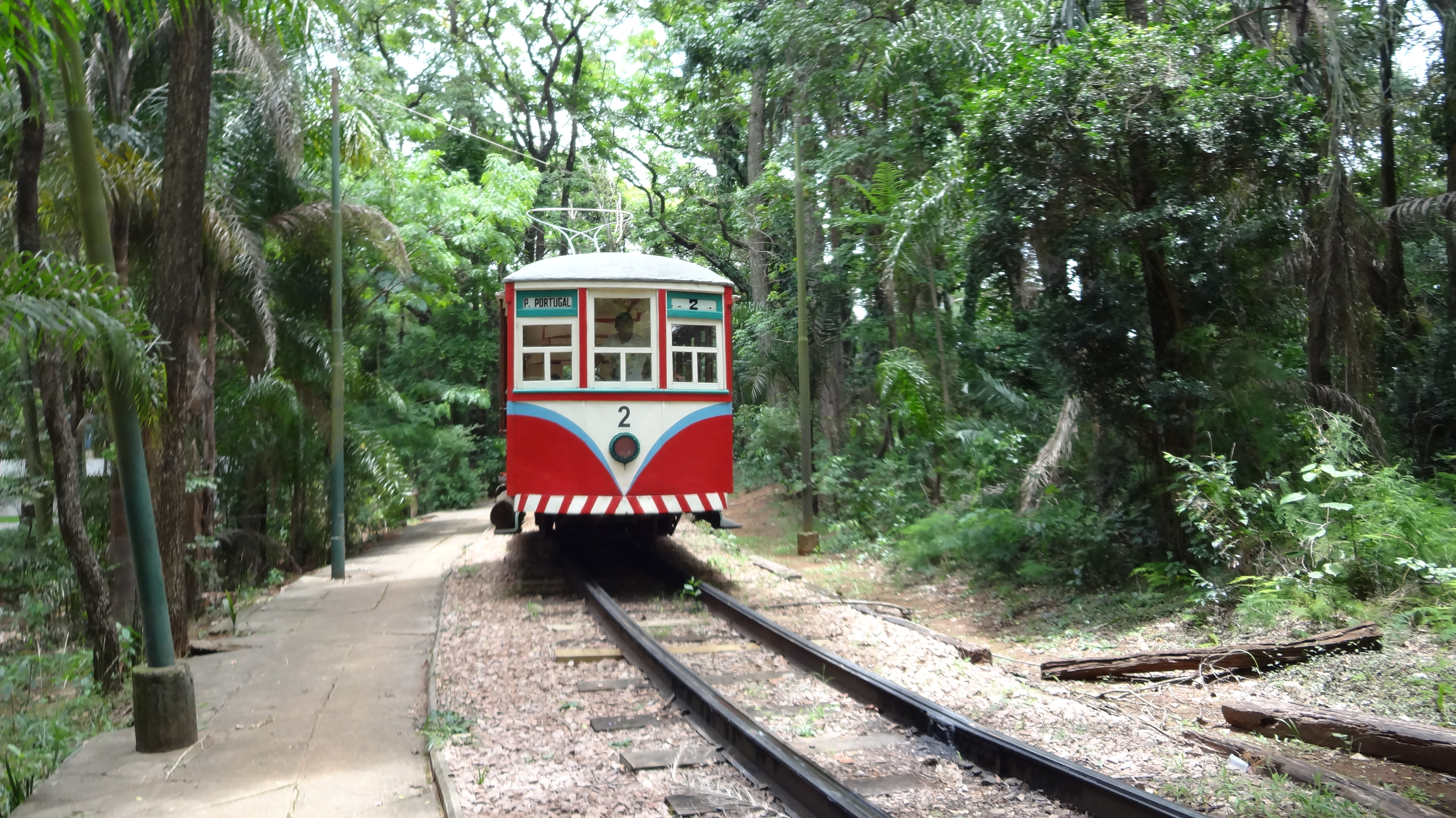
Old tramway in operation at Parque Portugal (also known as Parque Taquaral)

- the Castelo (Castle) Water Tower, which provides views over the downtown;
- the Historical Railway Society of Campinas, which maintains the Anhumas station, a set of steam locomotives and full carriages and which promotes regular trips along a picturesque region dotted with old coffee farms;
- the Lagoa do Taquaral Park, a much-beloved urban lagoon and adjacent wooded park, includes: a planetarium, a science museum, an indoor sports stadium and swimming pool, kart racing (now deactivated) and model airplane areas, an open concert auditorium, a floating caravel replica, an electric tramway (streetcar line), pedalos, plus facilities for several types of sports, including a long track for running and walking;
- the Rural Exhibition of Campinas is an annual agricultural fair that showcases the region's agricultural products and traditions;
- the region is rich in bird species, attracting birdwatchers from all over the world;

Campinas' readers of the Correio Popular newspaper and the Cosmo Website voted in July 2007 for the "Seven Wonders of Campinas".

The mountain region around Campinas has better travel and stay opportunities, such as in the spa cities of Serra Negra and Águas de Lindóia; and in Holambra, a rural region which was populated by immigrants from the Netherlands, with an annual flower festival and typical buildings and restaurants.

== Sports ==
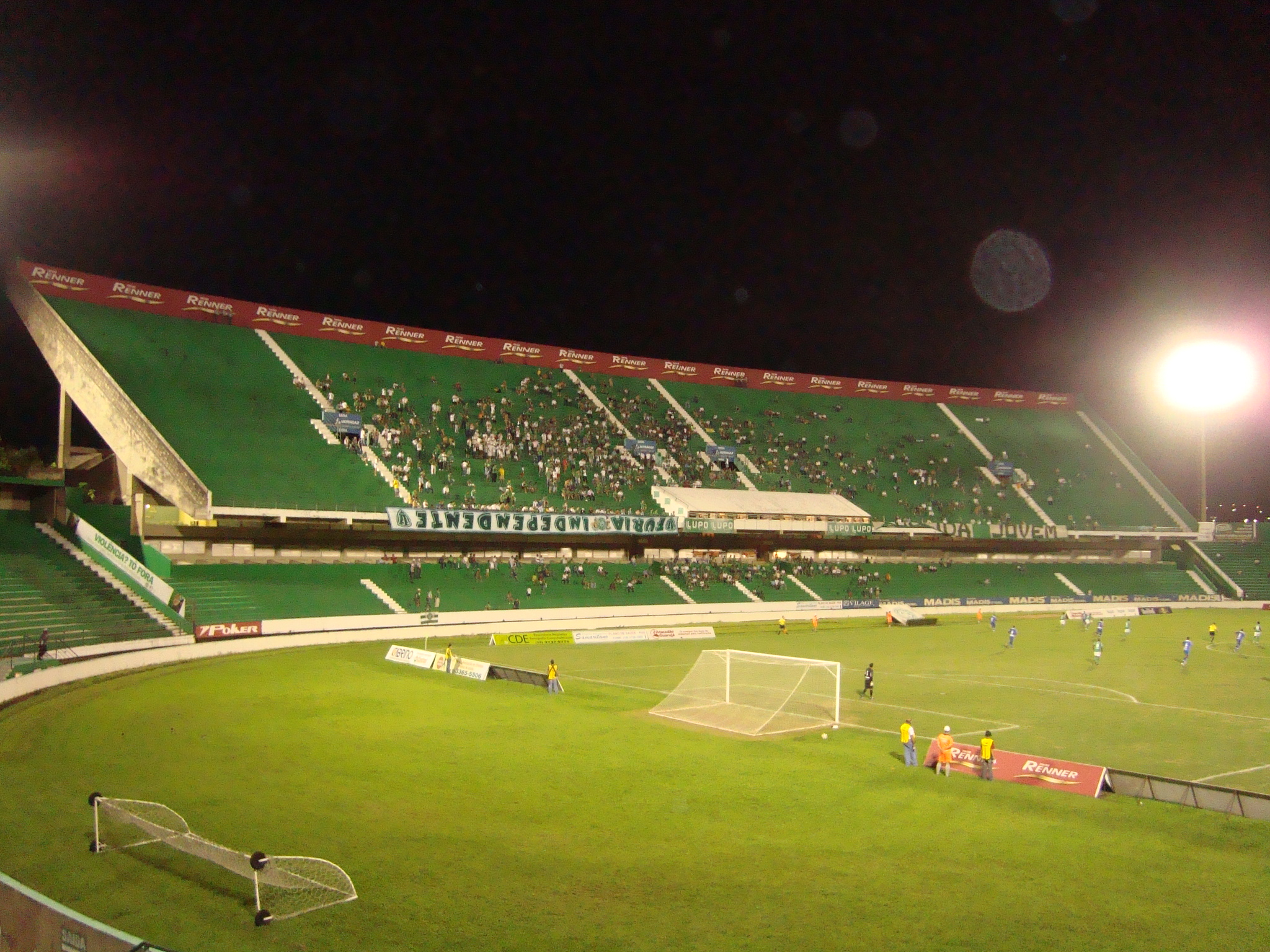
Brinco de Ouro Stadium at night.

Campinas is home to two football clubs nationally recognized: Associação Atlética Ponte Preta and Guarani Futebol Clube, who perform "Campineiro derby" match that is considered one of the most traditional of the state occurring since 1912. There is also Red Bull Brasil, which was created in November 2007 and lately has gained significant prominence. Women's football also has been outstanding, albeit amateur. In the story also revealed other clubs, such as Mogiana Sports Club, which was created on June 7, 1933, and came into bankruptcy in the 60s.

The city also has three major venues: Estádio Brinco de Ouro da Princesa, owned by Guarani, which opened in 1953 and today has a capacity of around 29,130 people, Sport and Recreation Centre in Campinas Dr. Horacio Antonio da Costa (Cerecamp Stadium or Mogiana Stadium), which belongs to the state of São Paulo and was opened in 1940, right by the Estádio Moisés Lucarelli, owned by Ponte Preta, which was built by its own supporters, and founded in 1948 and has the capacity to 19,728 visitors. It is popularly known as "Majestoso" (The Majestic One), for being the third-largest stadium in Brazil as the year of its foundation (1948), smaller only than Pacaembu, in São Paulo and São Januário, in Rio de Janeiro.

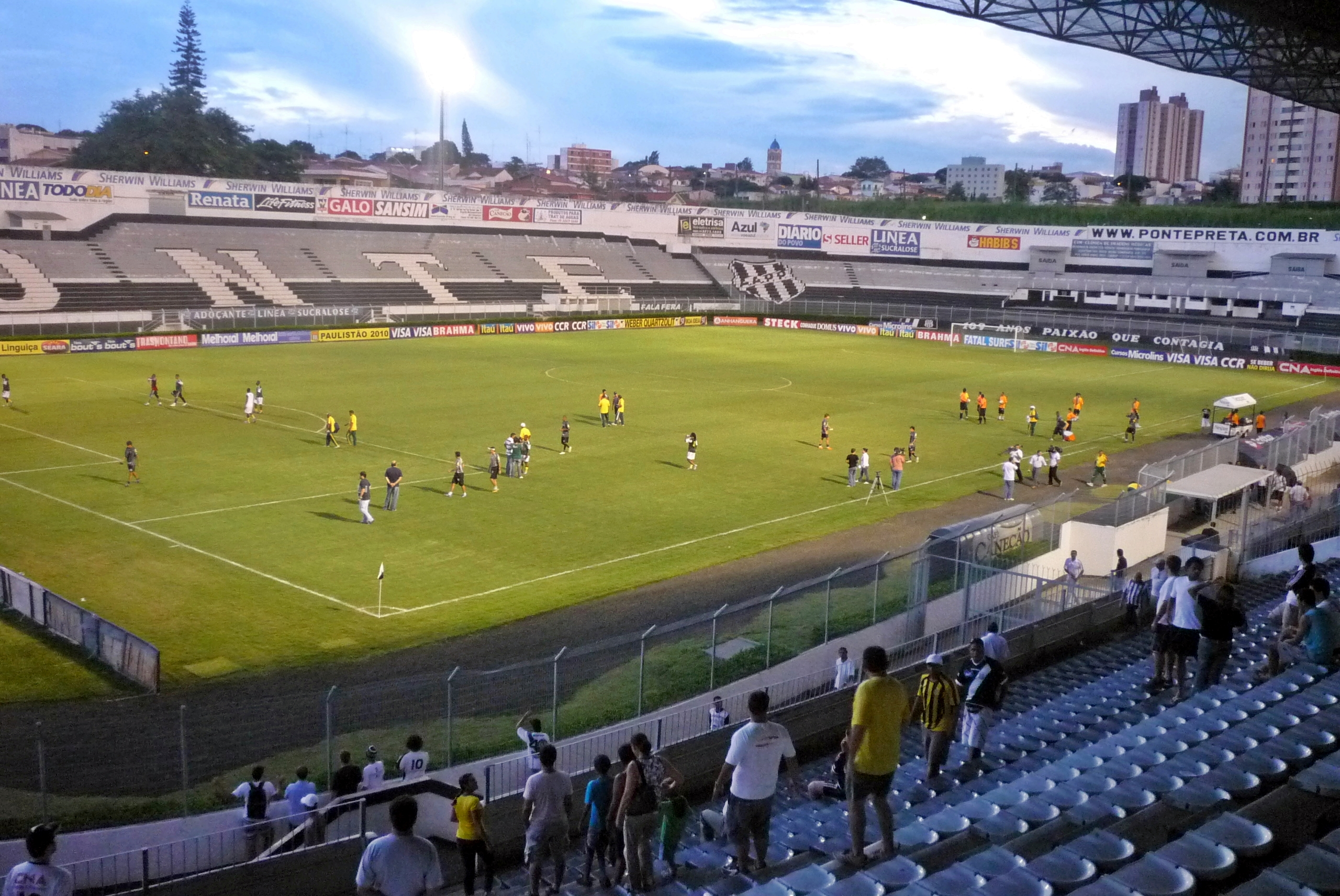
Moisés Lucarelli Stadium.

The city is still home to several sporting events in other modalities, such as Corrida Integração (Integration Race), which is held since 1983 by Pioneer Broadcasters Television (EPTV), being divided into two modes (a 5 km-dedicated to disabled people and wheelchair users, and another 10 km, for non-disabled people).

Campinas also has a tradition in the Open Games of the Interior, created in 1936, and competition involving various sports. Four times, hosted the competition (1939, 1945, 1960, and 1994), and ten times the city came out as the winner of the competition (1939, 1955, 1956, 1958, 1960, 1971, 1974, 1975, 1978, 1979), being the third city which has won the most competition.

In tennis, there is the Tennis Club of Campinas (CBT), which was created in 1913, offering, in addition to the blocks of the sport, swimming pools, courts for basketball and soccer, as well as rooms suitable for the practice of judo, gymnastics, and dance. Club de Regatas Campineiro and Swim (CCRN) also provides space for the practice of various types of Olympic sports.

== Government ==
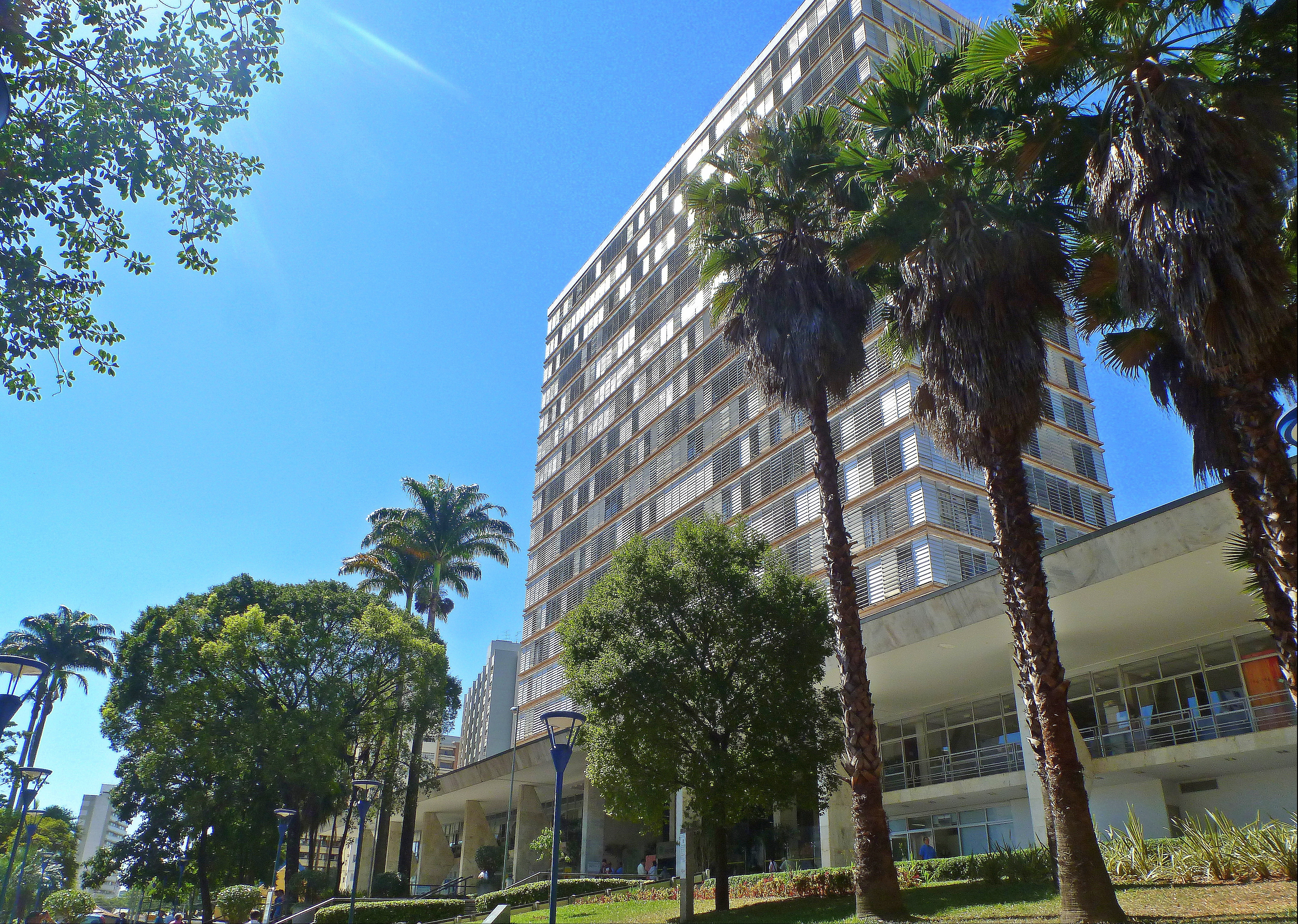
Jequitibás Palace, Campinas City Hall.

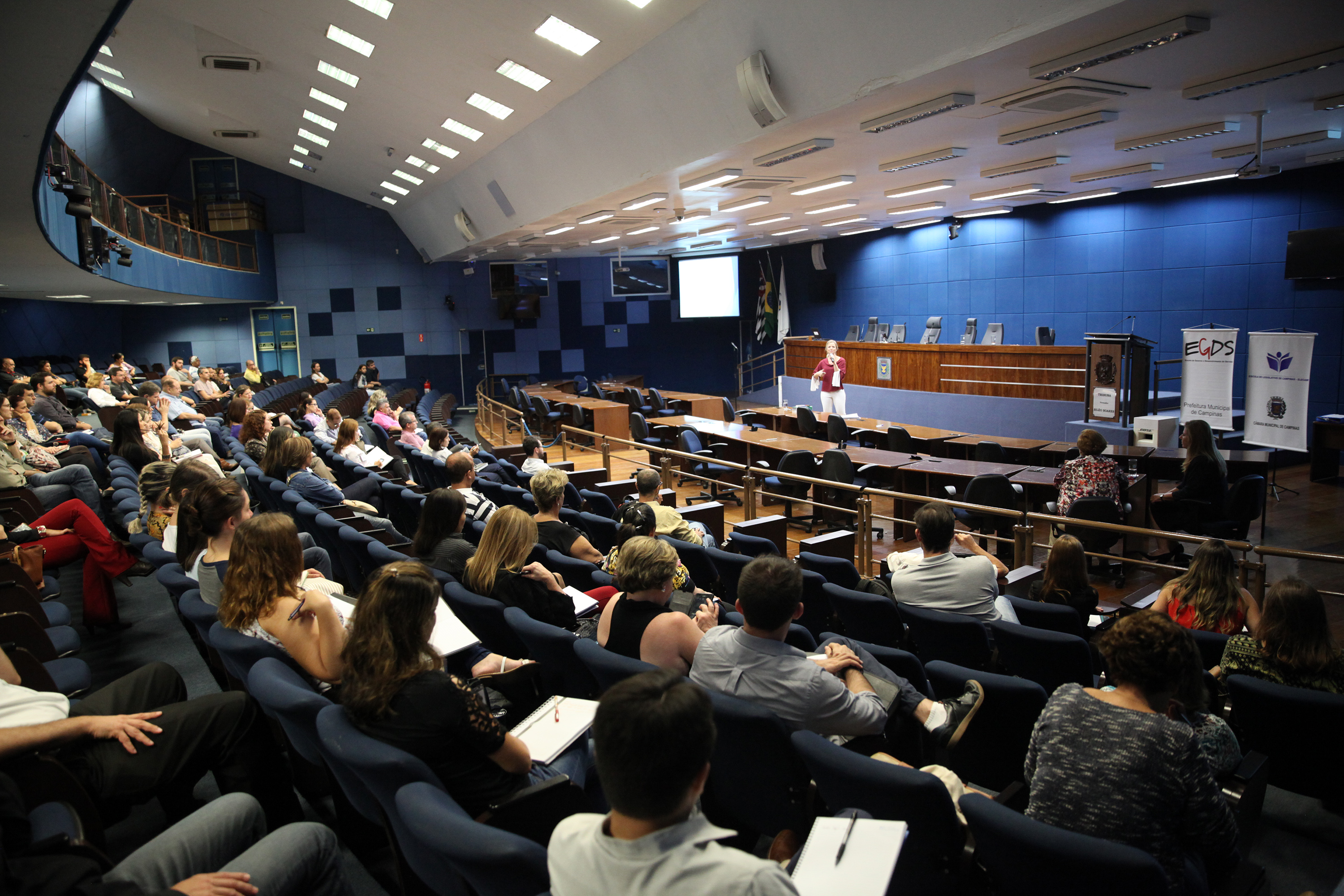
Municipal Chamber of Campinas.

The municipality is subdivided into one main district and four subdistricts, Joaquim Egídio, Sousas, Barão Geraldo and Nova Aparecida. There are also 14 regional administrations.

The Secretariat of International Cooperation (SMCI) was created on April 28, 1994. It is one of the 18 Secretariats of the City Hall of Campinas and it is currently located in that building.

Its main goals are:

- the attraction and facilitation for the arrival of new investments to the city;
- the expansion of the companies activities that are already established in the city;
- the perpetuation of the relations between the city, its international community, and partners, such as the Sister-Cities.

The Secretariat also acts as a supporter to other secretariats in the City Hall, often through: the identification of national and foreign potentials investors; keeping systematic contacts with executives in Brazil and abroad, Embassies, Chambers of Commerces and relevant International Organizations; presenting Campinas to the cities and interested investors.

=== Mayors ===
- Orozimbo Maia – 1904, 1908–1910, 1926–1930
- Ruy Hellmeister Novais – 1956–1959, 1964–1969
- Orestes Quércia – 1969–1972
- Lauro Péricles Gonçalves; 1973–1976
- Francisco Amaral; 1977–1982, 1997–2001
- José Roberto Magalhães Teixeira – 1983–1988, 1993–1996 (died of hepatic cancer while in office)
- Jacó Bittar – 1989–1992
- Antonio da Costa Santos (Toninho) – 2001 (murdered while in office)
- Izalene Tiene – 2001–2005
- Hélio de Oliveira Santos (Dr. Hélio) – 2005–2011 (deposed)
- Demétrio Vilagra – 2011(removed)
- Pedro Serafim Júnior – 2011
- Demétrio Vilagra – 2011 (deposed)
- Pedro Serafim Júnior – 2011–2012 (interim)
- Jonas Donizette – 2013–2020
- Dário Saadi – 2021–present

== Infrastructure ==
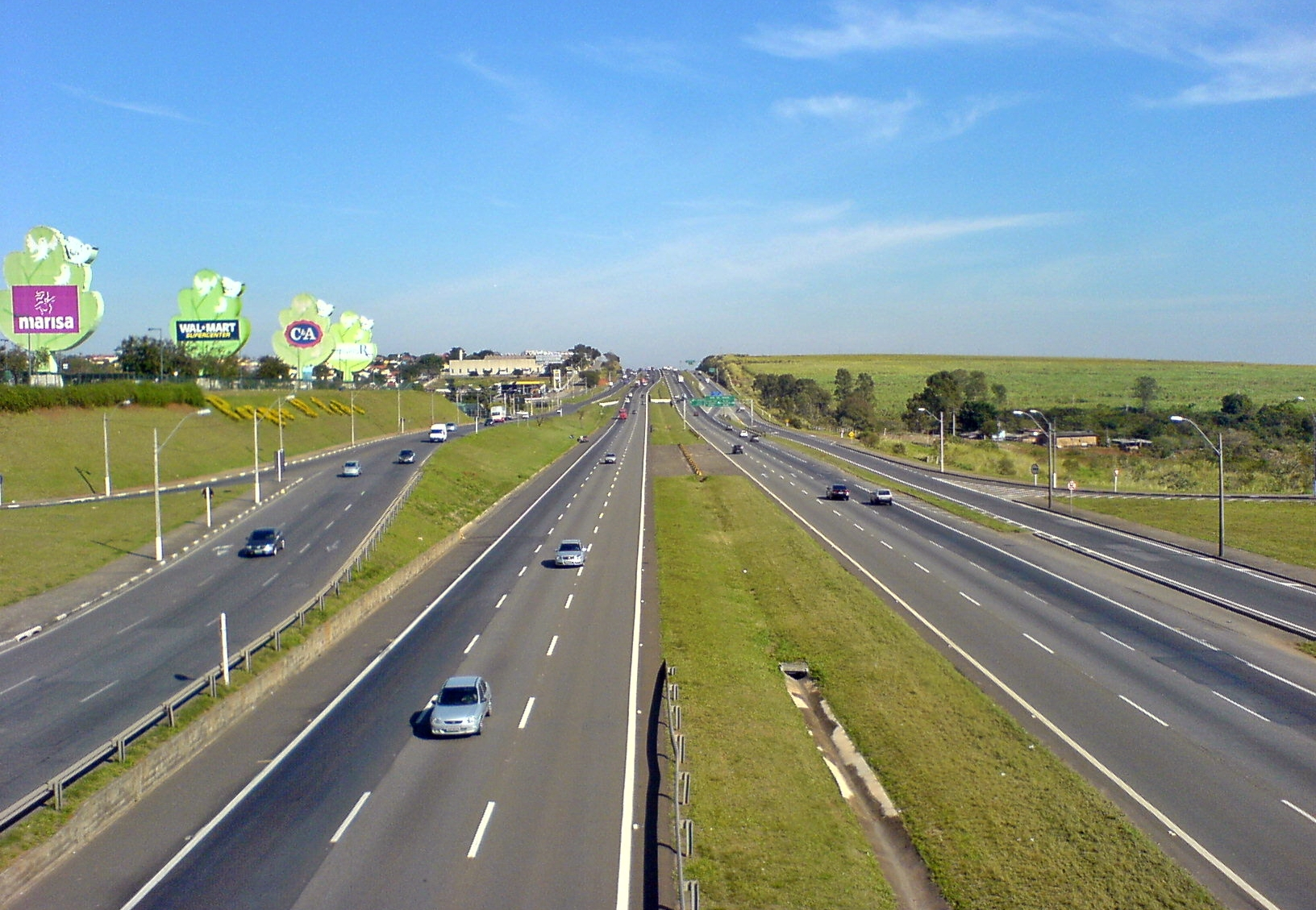
Dom Pedro I motorway, part of Campinas Beltway.

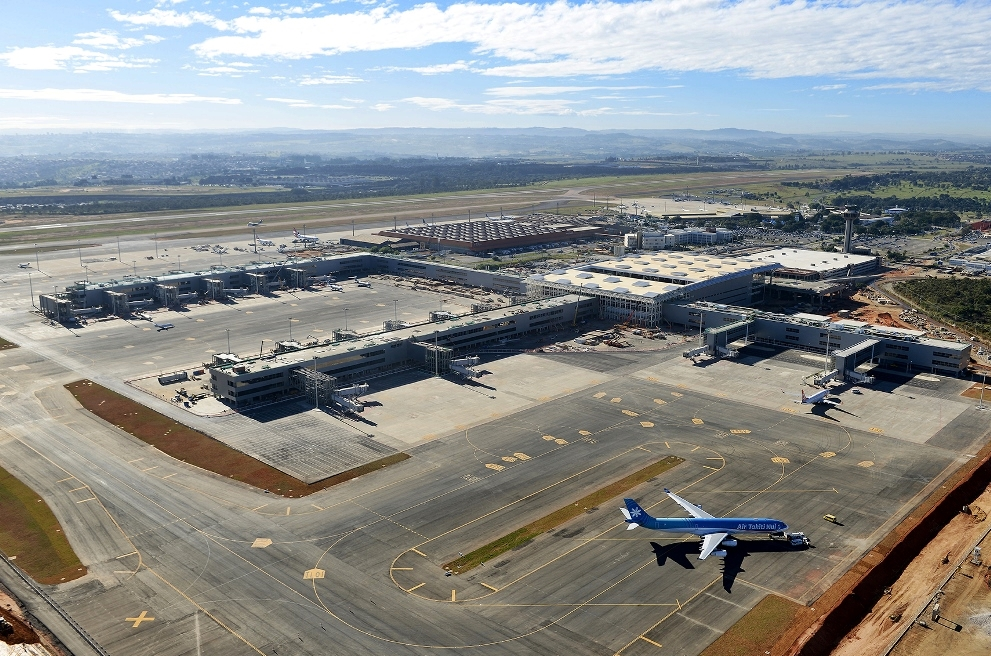
Viracopos International Airport is located in Campinas.

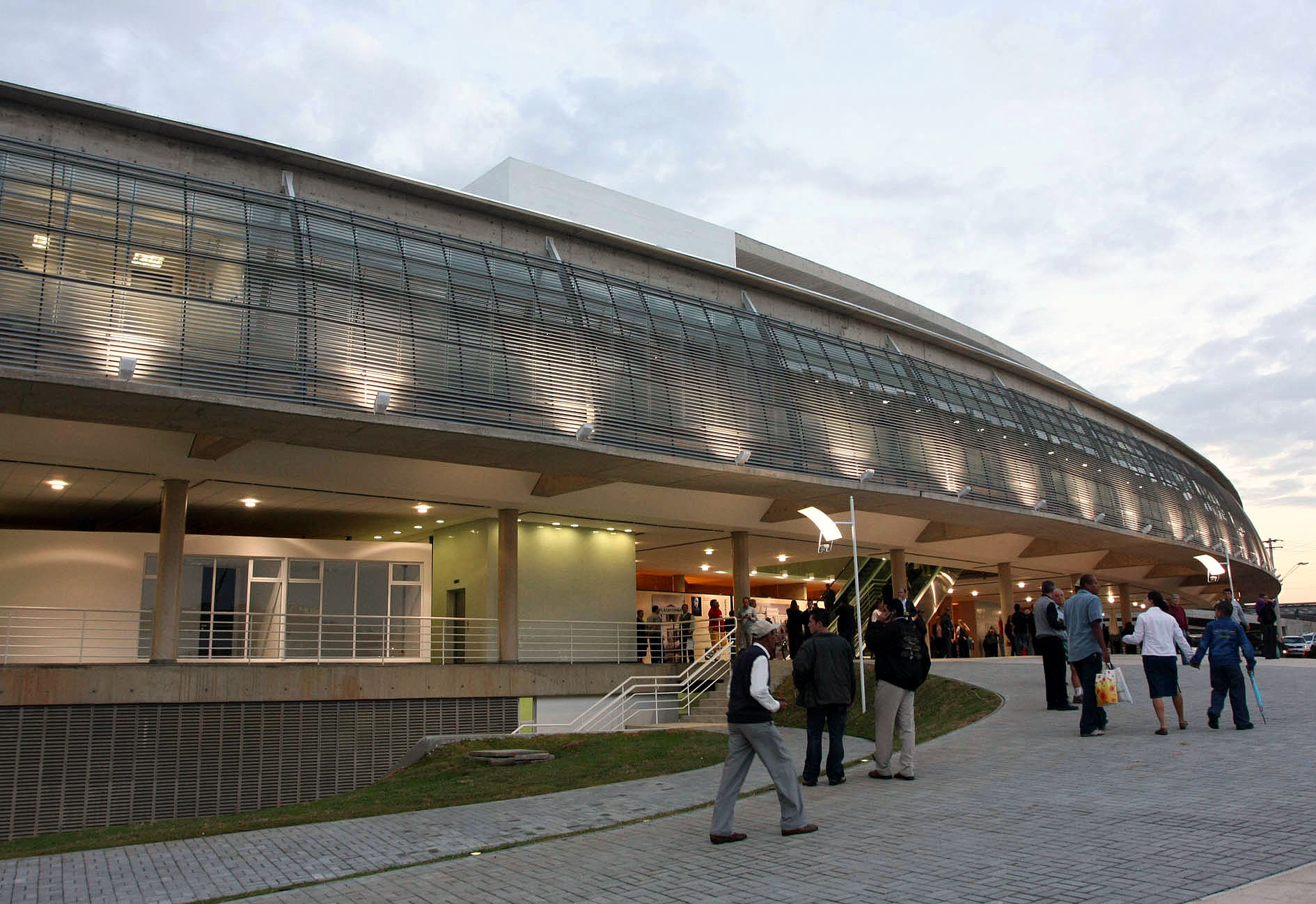
Coach Terminal.

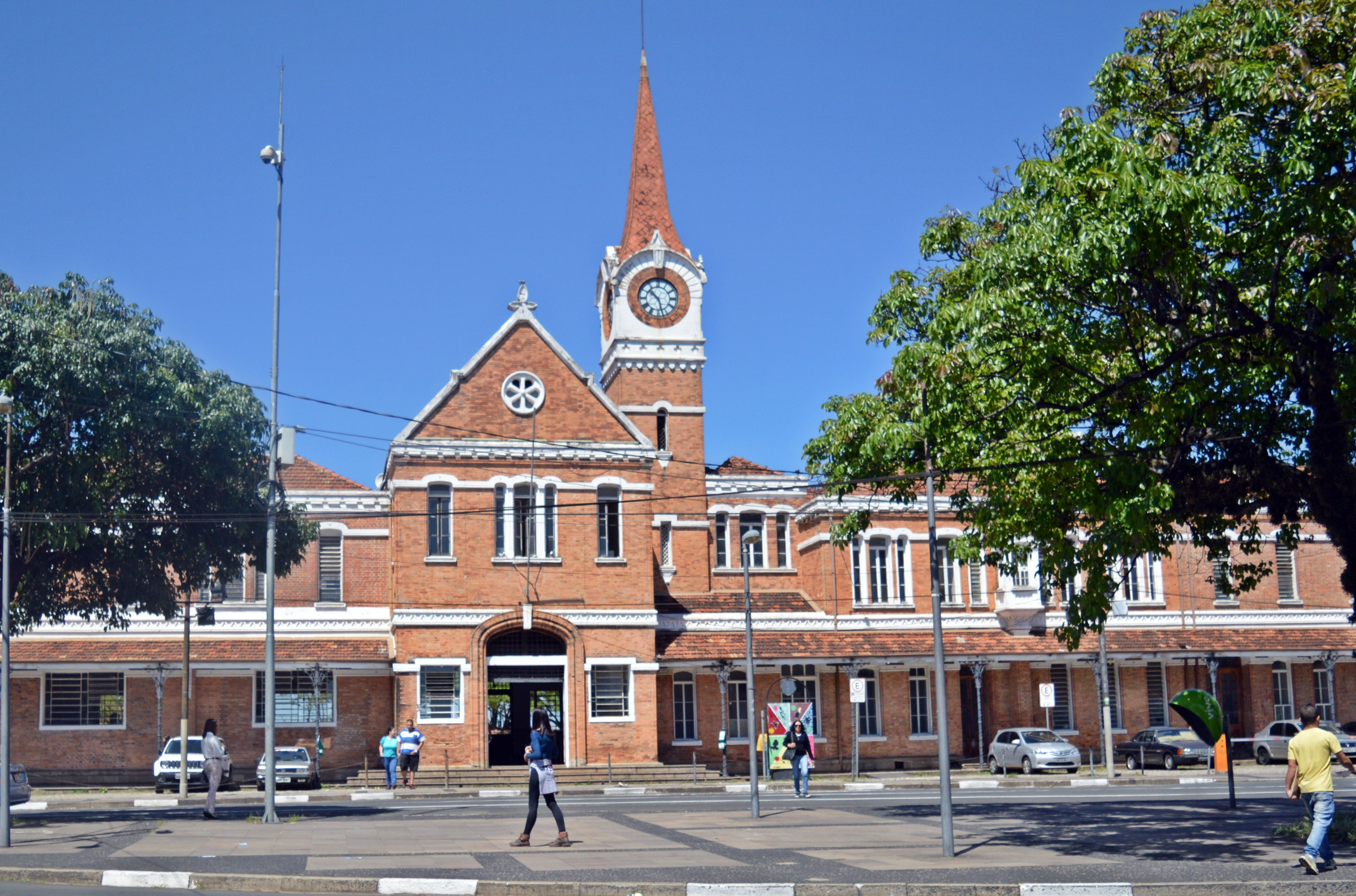
Campinas railway station.

=== Transportation ===
Campinas is a major transportation and telecommunications hub for the State of São Paulo, as it is located on the major motorways that connect the capital to the Northwest and Northern parts of the State. The city is served by the Campinas Beltway (Anel Viário) and the following main motorways:

- Rodovia Anhangüera
- Rodovia dos Bandeirantes
- Rodovia Santos Dumont
- Rodovia Dom Pedro I
- Rodovia Adhemar de Barros
- Rodovia Professor Zeferino Vaz
- Rodovia Jornalista Francisco Aguirre Proença

All these motorways are built according to the highest international standards (see highway system of São Paulo). The Anel Viário José Magalhães Teixeira (SP-038) around the city currently interconnects the Anhangüera and Dom Pedro I motorways.

The main airport of the city is Viracopos International Airport, located 14 kilometres (8.7 mi) from Downtown Campinas and 99 kilometres (62 mi) from the city of São Paulo. The airport serves as the main hub for Azul Brazilian Airlines, transporting 11.8 million passengers in 2022. It also operates the second-largest cargo terminal in Brazil. It is one of the fastest-growing airports in the country, and since it was turned over to the private sector in 2012, a number of improvements and innovations have been implemented through the Viracopos Brazil Airports concession.

A second facility, Campo dos Amarais Airport located 8 kilometres (5.0 mi) from downtown Campinas, is dedicated to general aviation.

=== Campinas public transportation statistics ===
The average amount of time people spend commuting with public transit in Campinas, for example to and from work, on a weekday is 77 min. 21% of public transit riders, ride for more than 2 hours every day. The average amount of time people wait at a stop or station for public transit is 23 min, while 52% of riders wait for over 20 minutes on average every day. The average distance people usually ride in a single trip with public transit is 7.9 km, while 16% travel for over 12 km in a single direction.

== Education ==
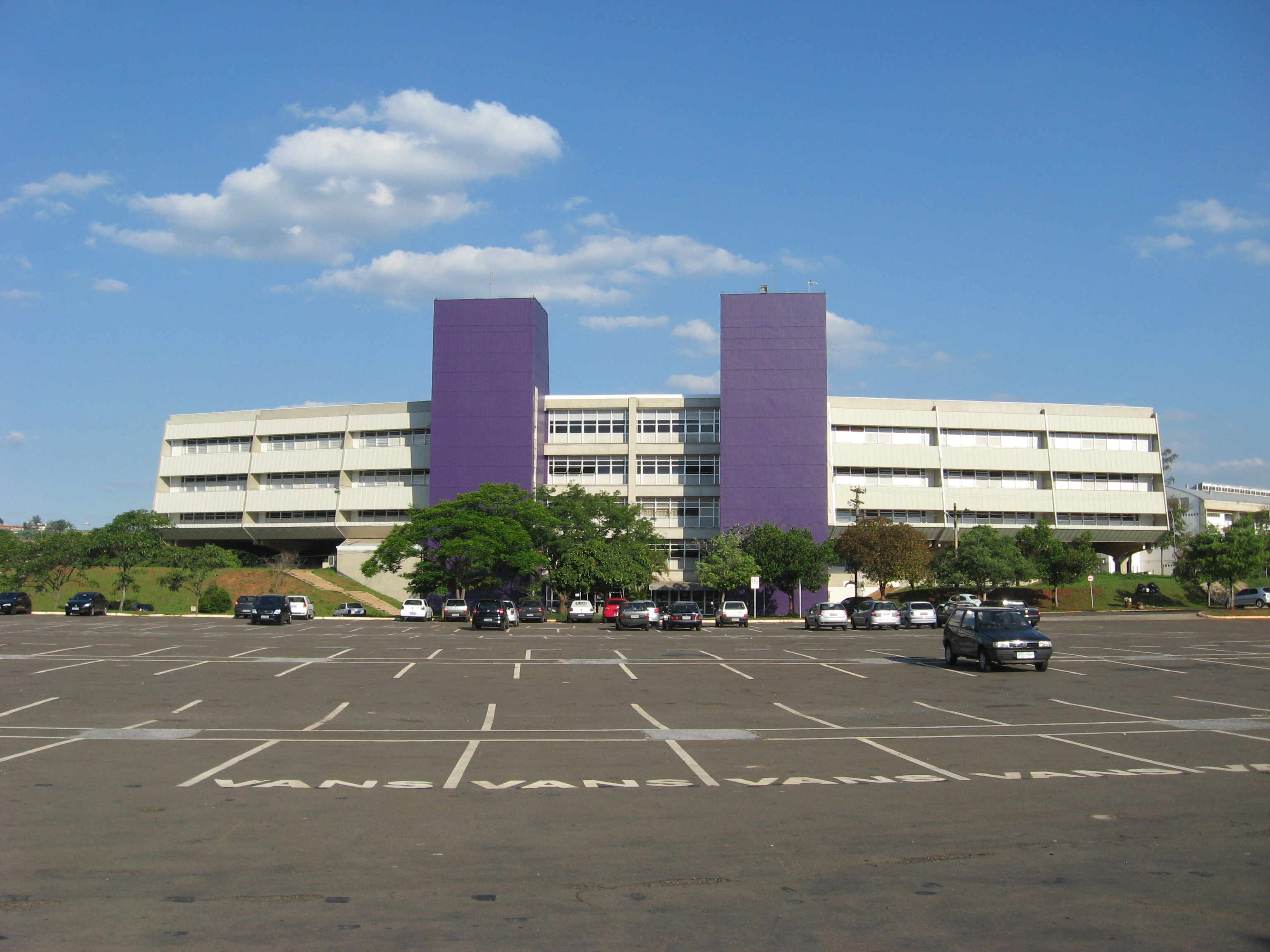
Typical buildings at Unicamp (University of Campinas).

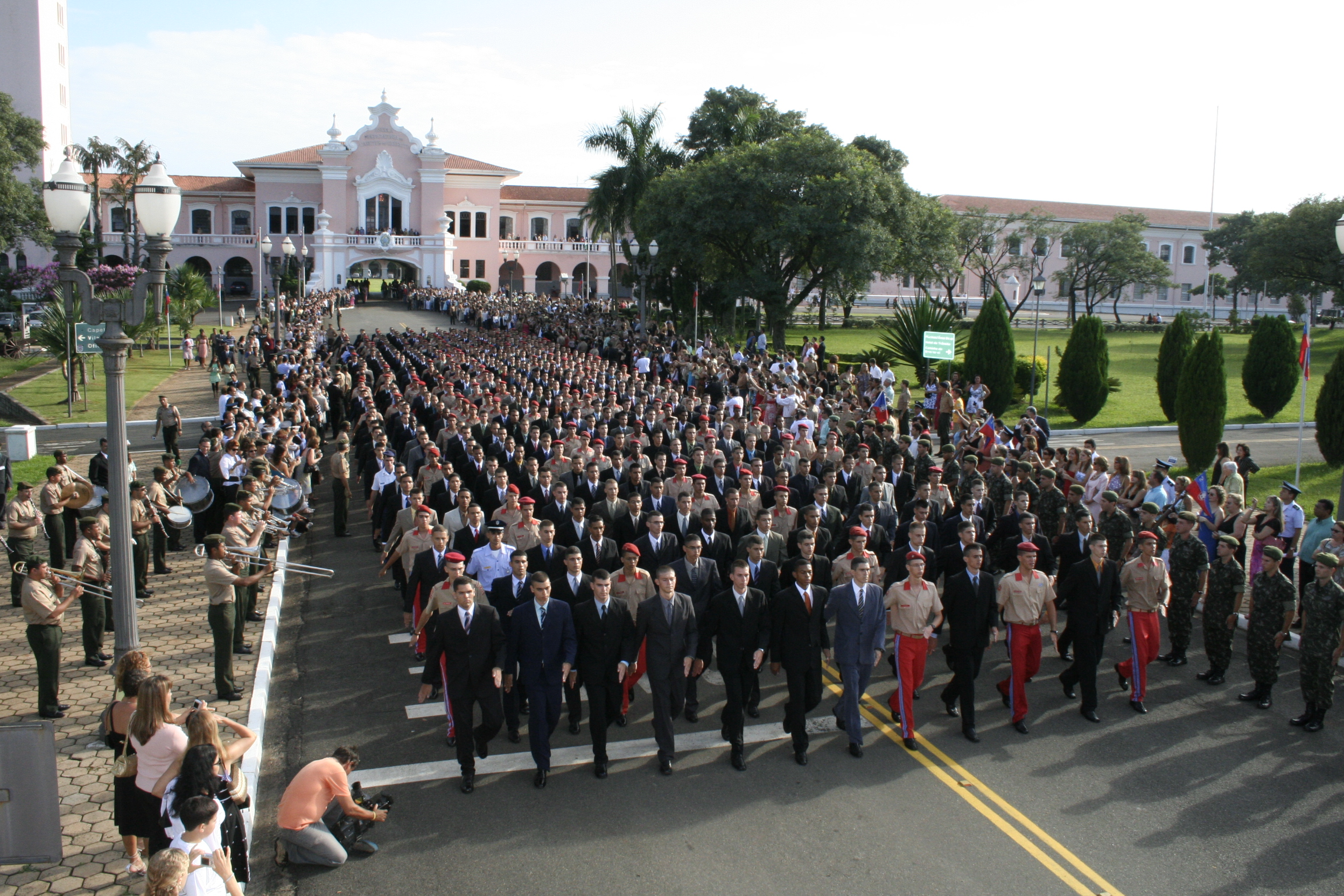
Brazilian Army Preparatory School of Cadets.

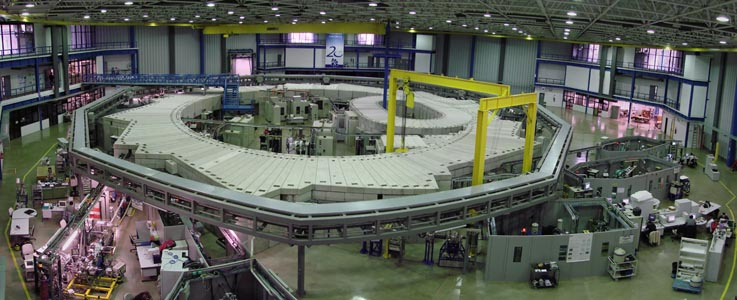
The National Synchrotron Light Laboratory

Portuguese is the official national language, and thus the primary language taught in schools. But English and Spanish are part of the official high school curriculum.

=== Universities and colleges ===
- Unicamp (Universidade Estadual de Campinas);
- IFSP (Instituto Federal de São Paulo);
- INPG Business School (Instituto Nacional de Pós-Graduação) - INPG
- PUC-Campinas (Pontifícia Universidade Católica de Campinas);
- UNIP (Universidade Paulista);
- FACAMP (Faculdades de Campinas);
- METROCAMP (Faculdade Integrada Metropolitana de Campinas);
- IPEP (Faculdades Integradas IPEP);
- UNISAL (Centro Universitário Salesiano de São Paulo);
- USF (Universidade São Francisco);
- ESAMC (Escola Superior de Administração, Marketing e Comunicação);
- Universidade Mackenzie;
- FAC (Faculdades Comunitárias de Campinas);
- Faculdades Fleming;
- Faculdade de Odontologia São Leopoldo Mandic.
- Fatec Campinas

=== Technical schools ===
- ETE Bento Quirino (Escola Técnica Estadual Bento Quirino)
- ETEC (Escola Técnica de Campinas)
- ETECAP (Escola Técnica Estadual Conselheiro Antonio Prado)
- POLI Bentinho (Colégio Politécnico Bento Quirino)
- COTUCA (Colégio Técnico da Universidade de Campinas)
- SENAI (Serviço Nacional de Aprendizagem Industrial)
- IFSP (Instituto Federal de São Paulo)

== Media ==
Three daily newspapers are published in Campinas, all owned by media company Rede Anhangüera de Comunicação: Correio Popular, Diário do Povo and Notícia Já (a tabloid). Several other local newspapers with weekly or monthly circulation are also published. Several magazines are also published in Campinas, the largest one being Metrópole, which circulates on Sundays as a supplement to Correio Popular.

The city has also a large number of radio stations as well as several local TV stations, including TV Universidades and Fenix TV (both not-for-profit), distributed by Net Campinas, the local cable distributor.

Campinas was the first city in Brazil, outside the capitals of Brazilian states, which received the transmission in digital signal for TV, by EPTV, an affiliate of Rede Globo, on October 3, 2008. It currently has the second TV station that also broadcasts the signal by TVB, now an affiliate of Rede Record, since February 2011 (before SBT, when it began on May 8, 2010).

In telecommunications, the city was served by Companhia Telefônica Brasileira until 1973, when it began to be served by Telecomunicações de São Paulo. In July 1998, this company was acquired by Telefónica, which adopted the Vivo brand in 2012. The company is currently an operator of cell phones, fixed lines, internet (fiber optics/4G) and television (satellite and cable).

== Notable people ==
- Maurício, volleyball player, Olympic Champion
- Campos Sales (politician, fourth president of Brazil)
- Carlos Gomes (opera composer)
- Nelsinho Baptista (footballer)
- Olavo de Carvalho (philosopher and writer)
- Daniel Dias (paralympic swimmer)
- Luciano do Valle (sports commentator)
- Felipe Meligeni Alves (tennis player)
- Marcelo Damy (physicist)
- Gabriel (footballer)
- Gilberto de Nucci (physician and biomedical researcher)
- Renato M.E. Sabbatini (biomedical scientist and writer)
- Lucas Pinheiro Braathen (2026 Olympic Champion in giant slalom)
- Luís Fabiano (footballer)
- Carlos Roberto Martins (entrepreneur)
- Crodowaldo Pavan (biologist and scientist)
- Henrique Martins (World Champion in swimming and Mister Brazil)
- Zeferino Vaz (physician, former dean of UNICAMP)
- Fabiana Murer (pole vaulter)
- Oliver Minatel (footballer)
- José Fiolo (swimmer)
- Sandy (singer)
- Fabinho (footballer)
- Marcel, basketball player
- Ricardo Mello, tennis player
- Fábio Gomes, pole vaulter
- Joao Victor Brito Silva Fifa Master

== Twin towns – sister cities ==
Campinas is twinned with:

- Asunción, Paraguay (1973)
- Auroville, India (2004)
- Cabinda, Angola (2009)
- Cascais, Portugal (2012)
- Concepción, Chile (1979)
- Córdoba, Argentina (1993)
- Cotorro (Havana), Cuba (2009)
- Daloa, Ivory Coast (1982)
- Durban, South Africa (2009)
- Fuzhou, China (1996)
- Gifu, Japan (1982)
- Indianapolis, United States (2009)
- Jericho, Palestine (2003)
- Malito, Italy (2006)
- San Diego, United States (1995)
- Viseu, Portugal (2012)
- Zaragoza, Spain (2013)

=== Cooperative agreements ===
Campinas signed Cooperation Protocol with:

- Fundão, Portugal (2012)

=== Domestic cooperation ===
Campinas cooperates with:

- Belém, Pará (2003)
- (Santa Catarina (state)) Blumenau, Santa Catarina (1983)
- Camanducaia, Minas Gerais (2010)
- (São Paulo (state)) Peruíbe, São Paulo (2007)
- Salinas, Minas Gerais (2012)
- (São Paulo (state)) Ubatuba, São Paulo (2007)

== See also ==
- List of municipalities in São Paulo
- Interior of São Paulo
