= Sousas =

Coordinates: 22°52′45″S 46°57′55″W

Sousas (Brazilian Portuguese pronunciation: [ˈsowzɐs]) is one of the six districts in the city of Campinas, in the state of São Paulo. It is located in the western part of the city, approximately 10 km from downtown. The Atibaia River passes through central Sousas.

It is a weekender destination for many Campinas residents, who visit it for restaurants and recreation.
