= Tietê Bus Terminal =

Bus station in São Paulo, Brazil

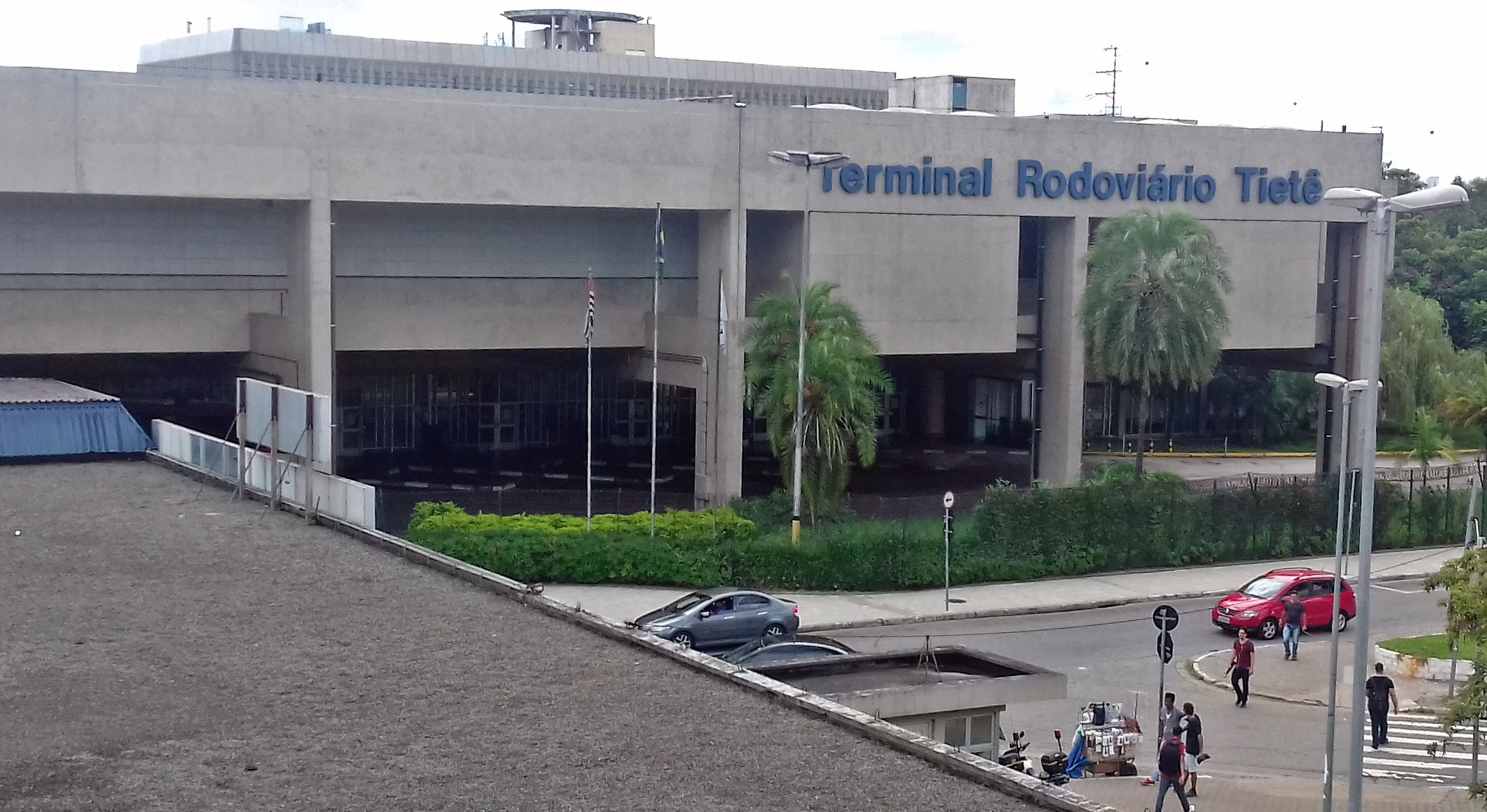

General information
- Location: Avenida Cruzeiro do Sul, 1800; São Paulo, São Paulo; Brazil
- Coordinates: 23°30′59″S 46°37′25″W
- System: Intercity bus
- Owner: São Paulo State Government
- Operator: Socicam
- Transit authority: São Paulo State Transit Authority
- Bus routes: 1,033
- Bus stands: 89
- Bus operators: See Companies below
- Connections: São Paulo Metro: at Portuguesa–Tietê ARTESP: 217, 218, 240, 314, 375, 566

Construction
- Platform levels: 2
- Parking: Yes
- Accessible: Yes
- Architect: Renato Viegas

Other information
- Website: www.terminalrodoviariodotiete.com.br

History
- Opened: 8 May 1982
Location
- Location within São Paulo Location within Brazil

The Tietê Bus Terminal (Portuguese: Terminal Rodoviário Tietê) (English pronunciation: chee-EH-teh) is the largest bus terminal in Latin America, and the second-largest in the world, after the Port Authority Bus Terminal in New York City. The terminal is located in the Santana district in the city of São Paulo, Brazil. The official name in Portuguese is Terminal Rodoviário Governador Carvalho Pinto, named after Carlos Alberto Alves de Carvalho Pinto, a former Governor of the State of São Paulo.

The world's longest active bus route, the 3,920-mile (6,310 km) Transoceánica, stops at the terminal en route to and from Rio de Janeiro and Lima, Peru.

== Operations ==
Comprising an area of 120,000 square metres (1,300,000 sq ft), the terminal operates 24 hours a day and serves 21 Brazilian states. There are 65 bus companies, 135 ticket counters, and 304 bus lines, serving 1,010 cities in five countries (Brazil, Argentina, Chile, Uruguay, and Paraguay). To accommodate this volume, there are 70 boarding platforms and 19 platforms for arrivals. On the busiest days, according to need, the platforms can be reversed. Coaches also have a "waiting parking lot", which has a capacity of 70 vehicles. The terminal has a daily circulation of 90,000 people and 3,000 buses. Around 295 workers are employed by the terminal for administrative, operational, janitorial, and security purposes. In 2002, the terminal began offering "check-in" service like at an airport for long-distance voyages. Passengers may check their luggage at a baggage counter. Electronic display panels show arrivals and departures at each platform.

The terminal can also be accessed via the Portuguesa-Tietê station on Line 1 of the São Paulo Metro.

== Gardens ==
The terminal features a 37,750 square metres (406,300 sq ft) garden including more than 40 species of trees.

== Additional services ==
The terminal offers 53 shops, 11 commercial vendor kiosks, 21 food-service vendors, a travel agency, free WiFi connection, free charging stations for laptops and cell phones, a pharmacy, a post office, a vaccination clinic, and 9 ATMs.

== Locations served ==
Locations served by the Tietê Bus Terminal are:

- State of São Paulo

Regions

- Ribeirão Preto
- Araraquara
- São Carlos
- Franca
- Piracicaba
- Campinas
- Jundiaí
- Bragança Paulista
- Vale do Paraíba
- Litoral Norte

- North Region (Except the states of Roraima, Amazonas, Amapá and Acre)
- Northeast Region
- Southeast Region
- Central-West Region (Except the states of Mato Grosso and Mato Grosso do Sul)
- South Region (Except the state of Paraná)
- Curitiba, Campo Mourão Paraná
- Argentina
- Chile
- Paraguay
- Uruguay

* The remaining locations are served by the Palmeiras-Barra Funda and Jabaquara bus terminals.

== Companies and destinations ==
The following companies operate in the terminal. Major destinations are shown in parentheses.

=== Domestic destinations ===
São Paulo

Greater São Paulo

  - Anhangüera (Jandira, Itapevi)
  - Imigrantes (São Bernardo do Campo, Diadema)
  - Internorte (Guarulhos, Mairiporã, Arujá, Santa Isabel)
  - Intervias (Itapecerica da Serra, Embu, Taboão da Serra, Juquitiba, São Lourenço da Serra)
  - Unileste (Mogi das Cruzes, Suzano, Itaquaquecetuba, Arujá, Guararema, Ferraz de Vasconcelos, Poá)

Airports

  - Airport Service (São Paulo-Guarulhos International Airport)
  - VB Transportes (Viracopos-Campinas International Airport)

Interior

  - Atibaia (Atibaia, Mairiporã, Nazaré Paulista, Piracaia, Joanópolis)
  - Bonavita (Limeira, Rio Claro, Paulínia, Capivari, Indaiatuba)
  - Bragança (Bragança Paulista, Atibaia, Mairiporã, Pinhalzinho, Águas de Lindóia)
  - Caprioli Turismo (Campo Limpo Paulista, Várzea Paulista, Monte Mor, Capivari, Rafard)
  - Cometa (Campinas, Jundiaí, Ribeirão Preto, São Carlos, Araraquara, Franca, Mogi Mirim, Mogi Guaçu, Aparecida)
  - Expresso Cristália (Campinas, Itapira, Mogi Mirim, Mogi Guaçu, Espírito Santo do Pinhal)
  - Empresa Cruz (Araraquara, São Carlos, Ibitinga, Itápolis, Iacanga, Taquaritinga, Novo Horizonte, Borborema, Gavião Peixoto)
  - Danúbio Azul (Araraquara, Araras, Barretos, Bebedouro, Jaboticabal, Matão, Leme, Olímpia, Pirassununga, Santa Rita do Passa Quatro)
  - Viação Lira (Campinas, Valinhos, Vinhedo)
  - Litorânea (Salesópolis, Paraibuna)
  - Nasser (Mococa, Cajuru, São José do Rio Pardo)
  - Ouro Verde (Americana, Sumaré, Nova Odessa)
  - Pássaro Marron (São José dos Campos, Mogi das Cruzes, Aparecida, Campos do Jordão, Caçapava, Guaratinguetá, Pindamonhangaba, Taubaté, Queluz, Bananal, Jacareí)
  - Piracicabana (Piracicaba, Americana, Santa Bárbara d'Oeste, Nova Odessa, Águas de São Pedro, São Pedro)
  - Rápido Fênix Viação (Jundiaí, Itatiba, Jaguariúna, Águas de Lindóia, Bragança Paulista, Morungaba, Pedreira, Serra Negra)
  - Rápido Luxo Campinas (Várzea Paulista)
  - Rápido Ribeirão (Ribeirão Preto, Sertãozinho)
  - Rápido Sumaré (Sumaré, Hortolândia)
  - Real Expresso (Ituverava, Igarapava, Orlândia, Guará, Aramina)
  - Santa Cruz (São João da Boa Vista, Caconde, Vargem Grande do Sul)
  - São Pedro (São Pedro, Piracicaba, Americana)
  - VB Transportes (Artur Nogueira, Capivari, Cordeirópolis, Cosmópolis, Eng. Coelho, Indaiatuba, Limeira, Paulínia, Rio Claro, Santa Gertrudes)

Coastal

  - Litorânea (Bertioga, Caraguatatuba, São Sebastião, Ubatuba, Ilhabela)

Rio de Janeiro

  - 1001 (Rio de Janeiro, Búzios, Cabo Frio, Nova Iguaçu, Nova Friburgo, Rio das Ostras, Niterói, Macaé, Campo Grande)
  - Cometa (Volta Redonda, Três Rios, Resende, Barra Mansa, Itatiaia)
  - Expresso Brasileiro (Rio de Janeiro, Nova Iguaçu, Duque de Caxias)
  - Expresso do Sul (Rio de Janeiro)
  - FlixBus (Angra dos Reis, Paraty, Resende , Rio de Janeiro)
  - Nova Itapemirim (Rio de Janeiro, Campos dos Goytacazes, Duque de Caxias)
  - Reunidas Paulista (Angra dos Reis, Paraty, Itaguaí)
  - Salutaris (Barra do Piraí, Magé, Petrópolis, Vassouras, Teresópolis)

Minas Gerais

  - Bragança (Extrema, Cambuí, Pouso Alegre, Varginha, São Gonçalo do Sapucaí, Monte Sião, Ouro Fino)
  - Cambuí (Cambuí, Itapeva, Extrema, Camanducaia)
  - Campo Belo (Campo Belo, Perdões, Arantina, Formiga)
  - Cometa (Belo Horizonte, Juiz de Fora, Poços de Caldas, São Lourenço, Caxambu, Cruzília)
  - Continental (Araxá, João Pinheiro, Patos de Minas, Paracatu, São Gotardo)
  - Expresso União (Passos, São Sebastião do Paraíso, Itaú de Minas)
  - FlixBus (Uberaba, Uberlândia)
  - Gardênia (São João del Rey, Ouro Fino, Lavras, Nazareno, Barbacena, Barroso, Bom Sucesso)
  - Gontijo (Belo Horizonte, Bocaiuva, Montes Claros, Sete Lagoas, Januária, Almenara, Janaúba, Espinosa)
  - Nacional Expresso (Uberlândia, Frutal, Monte Alegre de Minas, Ituverava)
  - Nasser (Guaxupé, Muzambinho, São Sebastião do Paraíso)
  - Nova Itapemirim (Governador Valadares, Teófilo Otoni, Ipatinga, Caratinga, Muriaé)
  - Pássaro Marron (Itajubá, Paraisópolis, Brasópolis, Delfim Moreira)
  - Real Expresso (Uberaba, Araguari)
  - Salutaris (Viçosa, Jequitinhonha, Visconde do Rio Branco, Coimbra, Almenara, Raul Soares, Ubá)
  - Santa Cruz (Muzambinho, Poços de Caldas, Paraguaçu, Alfenas, Três Corações, Pouso Alegre, São Thomé das Letras, Itajubá, Santa Rita do Sapucaí, Ouro Fino, Itajubá, Lambari).
  - Santa Teresinha (Varginha, Boa Esperança, Três Pontas)
  - São Cristóvão (Divinópolis, Abaeté, Itapecerica, Lagoa da Prata, Pitangui)
  - São Geraldo (Teófilo Otoni)
  - Util (Ouro Preto, Ouro Branco, Mariana, Santos Dumont, Conselheiro Lafaiete, Barbacena, Barroso, Lavras, São João del Rey, Lagoa Dourada, Nazareno)

Paraná

  - Cometa (Curitiba)
  - FlixBus (Curitiba)
  - Nova Itapemirim (Curitiba)
  - Penha (Paranaguá)
  - Pluma (Foz do Iguaçu)
  - Transbrasil (Campo Mourão)

Santa Catarina

  - 1001 (Florianópolis, Balneário Camboriú, Joinville, Itajaí)
  - Catarinense (Florianópolis, Blumenau, Itajaí, Balneário Camboriú, Joinville, Lages, Brusque, Rio do Sul, Tijucas)
  - Eucatur (Balneário Camboriú, Tubarão, Laguna, Imbituba)
  - FlixBus (Penha)
  - Pluma (Balneário Camboriú, Criciúma, Araranguá)
  - Reunidas Transportes (Florianópolis, Balneário Camboriú, Chapecó, Laguna, Tubarão, Curitibanos, Campos Novos, Dionísio Cerqueira, Caçador, Joaçaba, Mafra, Canoinhas)

Rio Grande do Sul

  - Nova Itapemirim (Porto Alegre)
  - Penha (Porto Alegre, Bagé, Pelotas, Caxias do Sul, Novo Hamburgo, São Leopoldo, Santa Cruz do Sul, Santana do Livramento, Rio Grande)
  - Pluma (São Borja, São Gabriel, Uruguaiana, Passo Fundo, Santa Maria)
  - Real Turismo (Ijuí, Passo Fundo, Santo Ângelo)
  - Reunidas Transportes (Erechim, Frederico Westphalen, Passo Fundo, Santa Rosa)
  - TTL (Chuí)

Distrito Federal

  - Rápido Federal (Brasília)
  - Real Expresso (Brasília)

Espírito Santo

  - Águia Branca (Vitória, Serra, Ibiraçu, Colatina)
  - FlixBus (Guarapari, Vila Velha, Vitória)
  - Nova Itapemirim (Cachoeiro do Itapemirim, Vitória, Vila Velha, Afonso Cláudio, Iúna)
  - São Geraldo (Linhares, São Mateus)

Goiás

  - Expresso São Luís (Bom Jesus de Goiás)
  - Nacional Expresso (Goiânia, Caldas Novas, Itumbiara)
  - Rápido Federal (Cristalina)
  - Real Expresso (Anápolis, Catalão)
  - Reunidas Paulista (Trindade)
  - Rotas do Triângulo (Goiânia, Goiatuba)
  - Transbrasiliana (Anápolis, Açailândia)

Tocantins

  - Gontijo (Palmas)
  - Reunidas Paulista (Palmas)
  - Transbrasiliana (Paraíso do Tocantins)

Bahia

  - Emtram (Barreiras, Rui Barbosa, Xique-Xique, Irecê, Seabra, Morro do Chapéu)
  - Novo Horizonte (Brumado, Macaúbas, Caetité, Abaíra, Ibipitanga)
  - Salutaris (Vitória da Conquista, Poções)
  - São Geraldo (Salvador, Feira de Santana, Vitória da Conquista, Porto Seguro, Ilhéus, Jequié)
  - Viação Nacional (Salvador, Feira de Santana)
  - Gontijo (Bom Jesus da Lapa, Guanambi, Feira de Santana, Santana, Jeremoabo, Miguel Calmon, Monte Santo, Paulo Afonso, Ubatã, Euclides da Cunha, Juazeiro, Ribeira do Pombal)

Pernambuco

  - Gontijo (Petrolina)
  - Nova Itapemirim (Recife)
  - São Geraldo (Recife, Garanhuns)

Ceará

  - Gontijo (Fortaleza, Crato, Iguatu, Crateús, Sobral)
  - Penha (Fortaleza)
  - Nova Itapemirim (Sobral)

Maranhão

  - Nova Itapemirim (São Luís, Imperatriz)

Piauí

  - Gontijo (Teresina)
  - Nova Itapemirim (Teresina, Canto do Buriti, Picos)

Paraíba

  - Nova Itapemirim (João Pessoa)
  - Penha (Campina Grande)
  - Gontijo (Patos)

Alagoas

  - São Geraldo (Maceió, Atalaia, Arapiraca)
  - Viação Nacional (Maceió)

Sergipe

  - São Geraldo (Aracaju)
  - Viação Nacional (Propriá)

Rio Grande do Norte

  - São Geraldo (Natal, Mossoró, Currais Novos)
  - Gontijo (Caicó)
  - Viação Nacional (Natal)

Pará

  - Nova Itapemirim (Belém)
  - Transbrasiliana (Belém, Altamira, Carajás, Marabá)

Rondônia

  - Nacional Expresso (Ji-Paraná)

Acre

  - Rotas do Triângulo (Rio Branco)

=== International destinations ===
Argentina

  - Crucero Del Norte (Buenos Aires, Bariloche, Rosário, Santa Fé, Puerto Iguazú, Posadas)
  - Pluma Internacional (Buenos Aires, Paso de los Libres)
  - Penha (Córdoba, Santa Fé, Resistência, Corrientes)

Chile

  - Chile Bus (Santiago)
  - Pluma Internacional (Santiago)

Paraguay

  - Brujula (Asunción, Ciudad del Este, Coronel Oviedo)
  - Pluma Internacional (Asunción, Ciudad del Este)
  - Sol del Paraguay (Asunción, Ciudad del Este, Coronel Oviedo)

Uruguay

  - EGA/Revelación (Montevideo, Punta del Este, San Carlos)
  - TTL (Montevideo, Punta del Este, San Carlos)

Peru

  - Ormeño (Lima, Cuzco)
