= Dutch Brazilians =

Brazilians of Dutch descent

Dutch Brazilians Neerlando-brasileiro Nederlandse Brazilianen
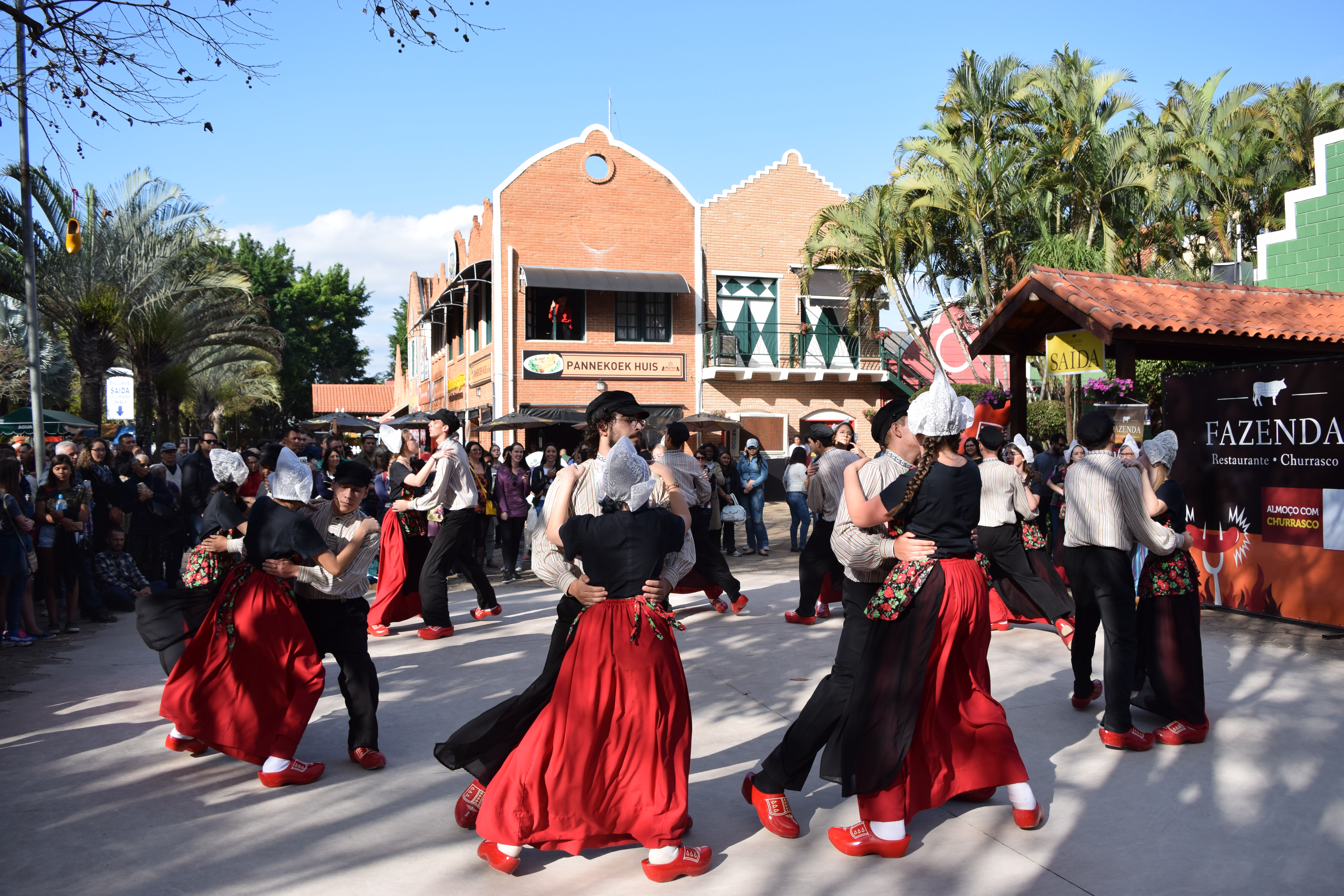
- Dutch descendants in Holambra.

Total population
- 10,954 (Dutch citizens)

Regions with significant populations
- Predominantly Northeast Region, South Region and Southeast Region

Languages
- Portuguese · Dutch

Religion
- Roman Catholicism, Protestantism

Related ethnic groups
- Dutch people, Flemings, Frisians, as well as other White Brazilians

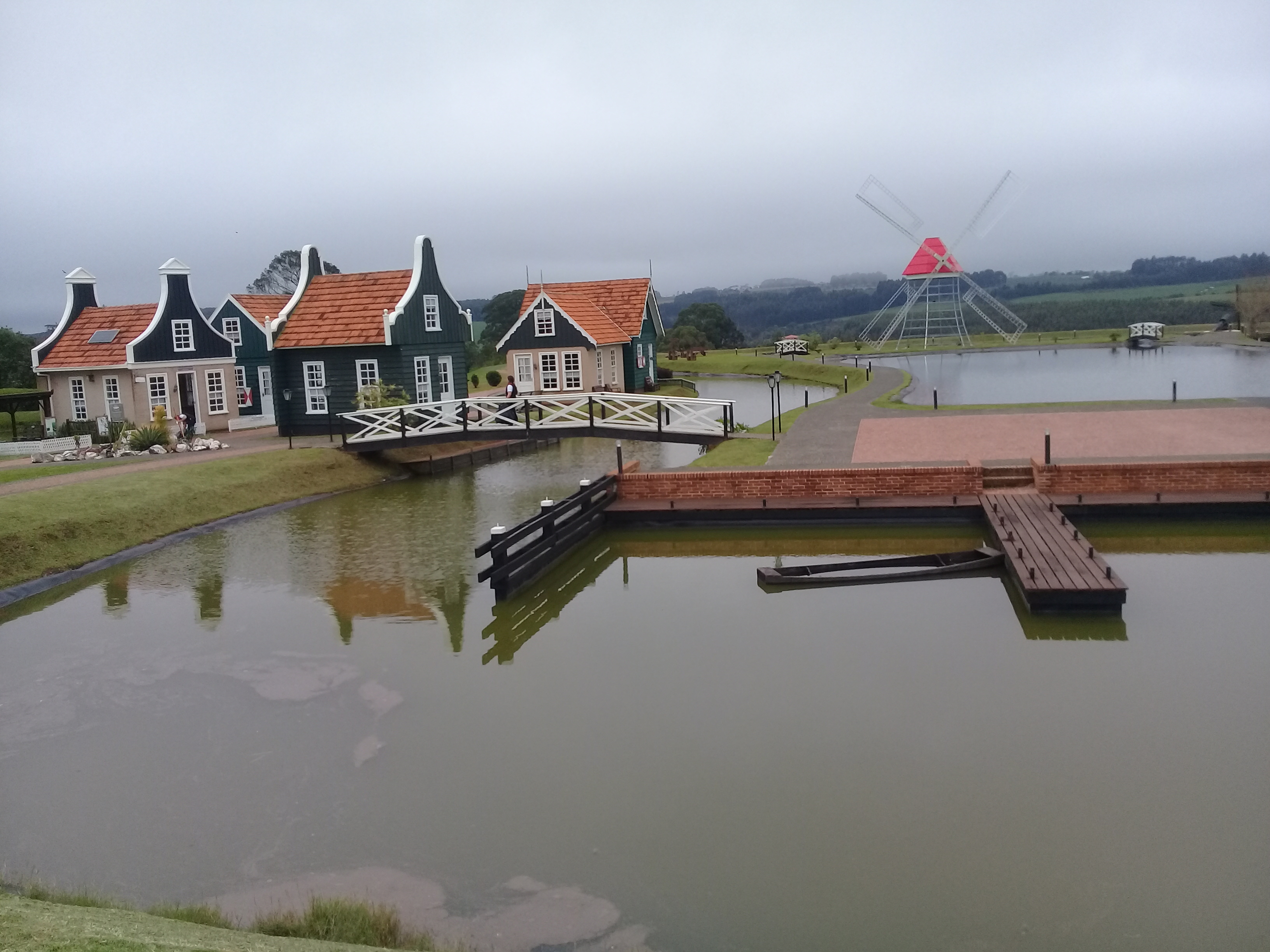
View of the Carambeí Historical Park mill and houses in Dutch architecture on the left

Dutch Brazilians (Portuguese: Neerlando-brasileiro; Dutch: Nederlandse Brazilianen) refers to Brazilians of full or partial Dutch ancestry. Dutch Brazilians are mainly descendants of immigrants from the Netherlands.

The Dutch were among the first Europeans settling in Brazil during the 17th century. They controlled the northern coast of Brazil from 1630 to 1654. A significant number of Dutch immigrants arrived in that period. The state of Pernambuco (then Captaincy of Pernambuco) was once a colony of the Dutch Republic from 1630 to 1661. There are a considerable number of people who are descendants of the Dutch colonists in Paraíba (for example in Frederikstad, today João Pessoa - the second biggest Dutch city in Brazil during colonial period after Mauritsstad), Pernambuco, Alagoas and Rio Grande do Norte.

During the 19th and 20th century, Dutch immigrants from the Netherlands immigrated to the Brazil's Center-South, founded a few cities and prospered. The majority of Dutch Brazilians reside in Espírito Santo, Paraná, Rio Grande do Sul, Pernambuco and São Paulo. There are also small groups of Dutch Brazilians in Goiás, Ceará, Rio Grande do Norte, Mato Grosso do Sul, Minas Gerais and Rio de Janeiro.

== Dutch presence in Brazil ==
Flag of New Holland

Historical population
| Period | Total |
|---|---|
| 1640–46 | 15,000 |
| 1654 | 20,000 |

Mauritsstad population (1650)
| Total | 8,000 |
|---|---|
| Ameridians and Negros | 3,000 to 4,000 |
| Vrijburghers | 3,400 |
| Jews | 600 |

On May 8, 1624, the Dutch West India Company invaded Bahia, but surrendered to the Spanish and Portuguese on May 1, 1625. By 1629 the Dutch had begun to direct their efforts towards Pernambuco and by 1630 they had conquered Olinda and Recife. Between 1630 and 1654, the Dutch controlled most of the Northeast Region of Brazil, specifically Pernambuco, while expanding into Algoas, Sergipe, Paraíba, and Rio Grande do Norte. Recife, then known as Mauritsstad, was their main center. This period was referred to as the Tempo dos Flamengos (The Time of the Flemings) by José Antônio Gonsalves de Mello.

Attempts to attract settlers from the United Provinces was fruitless. Civilian Dutch settlers were a small population with less than 3,000 in 1644. The Jewish population was better recorded with a peak number of 1,450 people out of that 3,000. The Dutch encouraged Jewish immigration from Amsterdam (though some also came from other parts of western, notable Livorno), as the Dutch Jews were Portuguese and Dutch speaking which allowed them to become the main brokers and intermediaries between the Dutch authorities and the Luso-Brazilians which grew the region's sugar production. The first synagogue in the Americas, Kahal Zur Israel Synagogue - was established by the Dutch in Recife in 1636.

In 1645, Portugues planters revolted against Dutch rule which greatly damaged the sugar plantations and economy. Dutch control of the interior regions weakened with settlers retreating into the urban centers. Between 1645 and 1654, Dutch civilians and soldiers had fled with some relocating Dutch colonies in the Caribbean (Suriname and Curaçao mainly), New Amsterdam, and other territories in the Atlantic. By 1654 the Portuguese had recaptured Recife ending Dutch Brazil.

Haplogroup 2 among White Brazilians
| Location | % |
|---|---|
| Brazil | 19 |
| South Region | 28 |
| Northeast Region | 19 |
| North Region | 14 |
| Southeast Region | 12 |

=== Dutch descendants in the Northeast ===
Colonial reports stated that there was a strong rate of miscegenation between Amerindians, Portuguese, Blacks, Jews, Dutch, Germans, French and Englishmen during the period of the Dutch Brazil colony. The majority of soldiers and marines who lived in the Nieuw-Holland were Dutch, Germans, Norwegians, Scots and Jews. The absence of women in the colony explained the high rate of mixed race people.

In 2000, a genetic study among white Brazilians showed that 19% of people born in the Northeast had a genetic marker for chromosome Y that is common in Europe (haplogroup 2 - corresponding today to the sum of haplogroups I, G and J). This shows an excess of 6% when compared to Portugal (13%). The other Brazilian region which also has a higher frequency than Portugal is the South Region (28%). According to the research, the excess in both regions could be explained as due to the strong European immigration in the South Region and the Dutch presence in the Northeast. Another study showed a higher contribution of European ancestry in chromosome Y among people from the Northeast Region, Brazil (94,74%) when compared with samples from Southeast Brazil (85,88% - 88,1%).

== The second wave ==
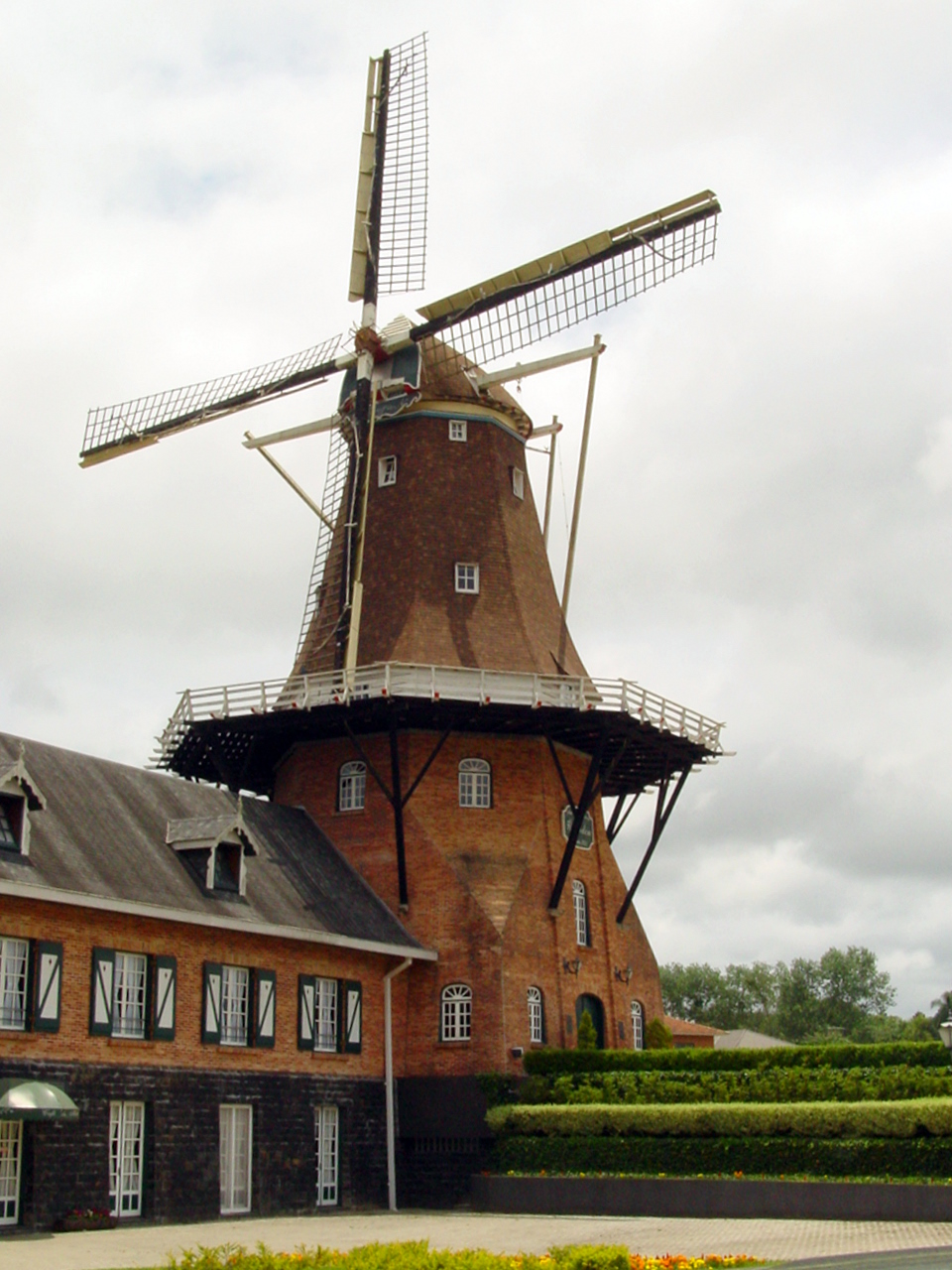
Windmill De immigrant in Castrolanda, Paraná

A modern wave of Dutch immigration to Brazil began between 1858 and 1862 in which 1,024, migrants, mainly from Zeeland, settled in Espírito Santo establishing the villages of Holanda and Holandinha in Santa Leopoldina. Between 1840 and 1940 only 8,200 Dutch immigrated to Brazil with another 4,850 immigrating between 1946 and 1963. This settlement of five hundred primarily Reformed folk from West Zeelandic Flanders in the province of Zeeland was not successful. All further immigration came to an end and contacts with the homeland declined. In 1973, the village was rediscovered by missionaries.

After the Second World War, the Dutch Organization of Catholic Farmers and Vegetable Growers (KNBTB) coordinated a new flow of Dutch immigrants in search for a new life and new opportunities in Brazil. The most known Dutch settlements in Brazil are Holambra I and Holambra II (because they became leading producers of flowers), but other settlements were established as well, and in time these small villages became cities.

Also arrived after Second World War were Eurasian refugees of mixed Indonesian and Dutch blood called Indos. These Indos traveled to Brazil because the Dutch society did not consider their war experience in Indonesia, and did not recognize the European status the Indos held dearly in their mother country. The number of Indos in Brazil was never counted because they are a part of the overall Dutch-Brazilian population.

=== Colony of Holambra ===
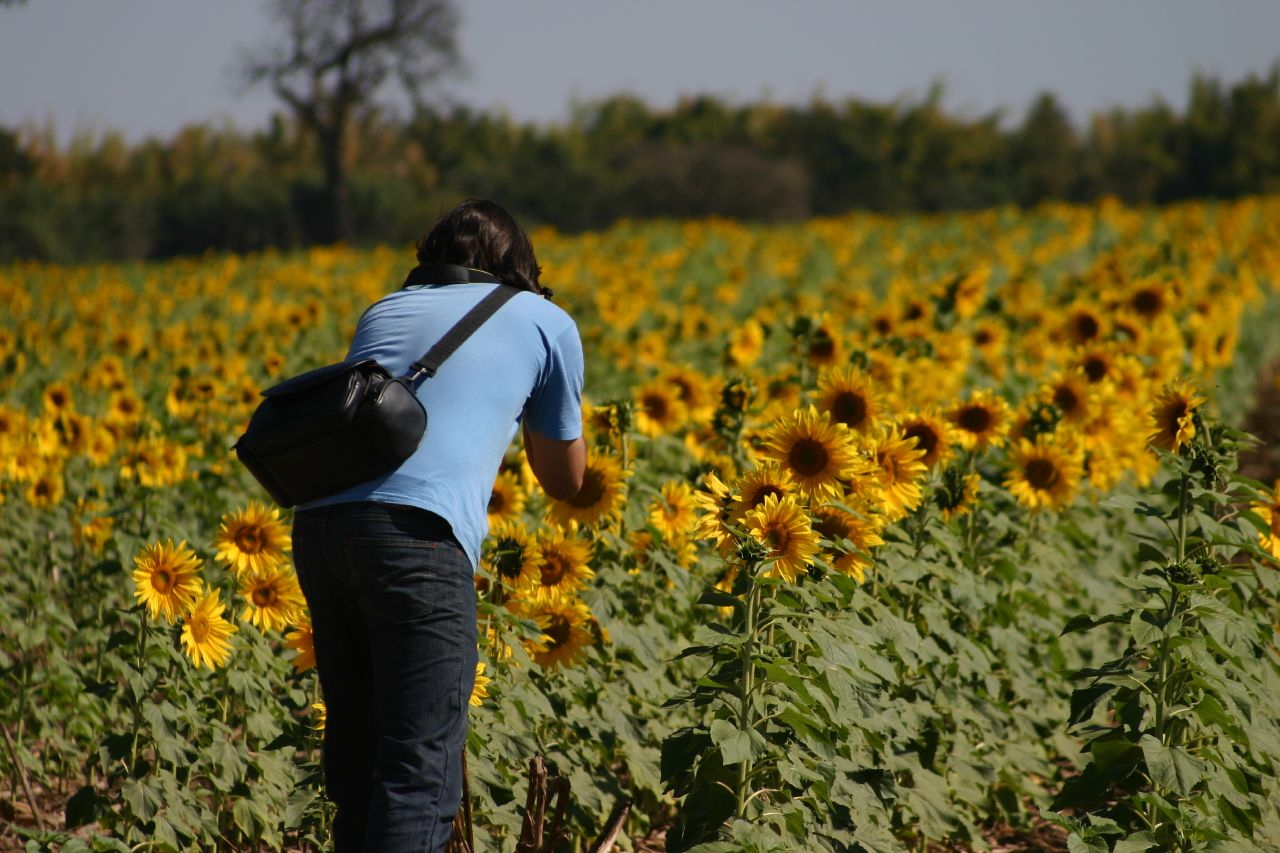
A sunflower field in Holambra

Holambra is a municipality in São Paulo. The colony Holambra (from the words Holland-America-Brazil) and The Cooperativa Agropecuária de Holambra (Cattle Farming Cooperation of Holambra) were founded in 1948 by Catholic Dutch immigrants at the farm Fazenda Ribeirão, between the cities of Jaguariúna, Santo Antônio de Posse, Artur Nogueira and Cosmópolis. After a referendum in 1991 where 98% of the population voted in favor of political autonomy for the area, Holambra gained city status in January 1993.

The cows that were shipped in from the Netherlands by the initial colonists did not survive the heat and tropical diseases and so the colonists diversified to pig and chicken farming. As the colony around the farm grew in the following decades, the focus shifted from agriculture to horticulture. Famous for its large production of flowers and plants and for the yearly event Expoflora, Holambra receives tens of thousands of tourists each year. In April 1998, that fact was recognized as Holambra gained the status of Estância Turística, touristic location.

== Notable Dutch Brazilians ==
Dutch-descended families in Brazil are used to be celebrated in politics and culture:

- Aurélio Buarque de Holanda Ferreira – lexicographer, philologist and translator
- Bebel Gilberto – singer and composer
- Chico Buarque – singer, musician, composer, writer and poet
- David Neeleman – businessman
- Eduardo Wandenkolk – naval officer
- Gilberto Freyre – cultural anthropologist, historian, journalist and congressman
- Djavan – singer and composer
- João Maurício Vanderlei, Baron of Cotejipe – former Prime Minister of Brazil
- José Wilker – actor and director
- Lobão – singer, songwriter, multi-instrumentalist and writer
- Marcel van Hattem – politician
- Mariana Ximenes – actress
- Nelson Piquet Jr. – racing driver

== See also ==
- Dutch Brazil
- Dutch people
- White Brazilians
- Dutch Surinamese
- Brazil—Netherlands relations
- Brazilians in the Netherlands
