= Holambra =

- Municipality
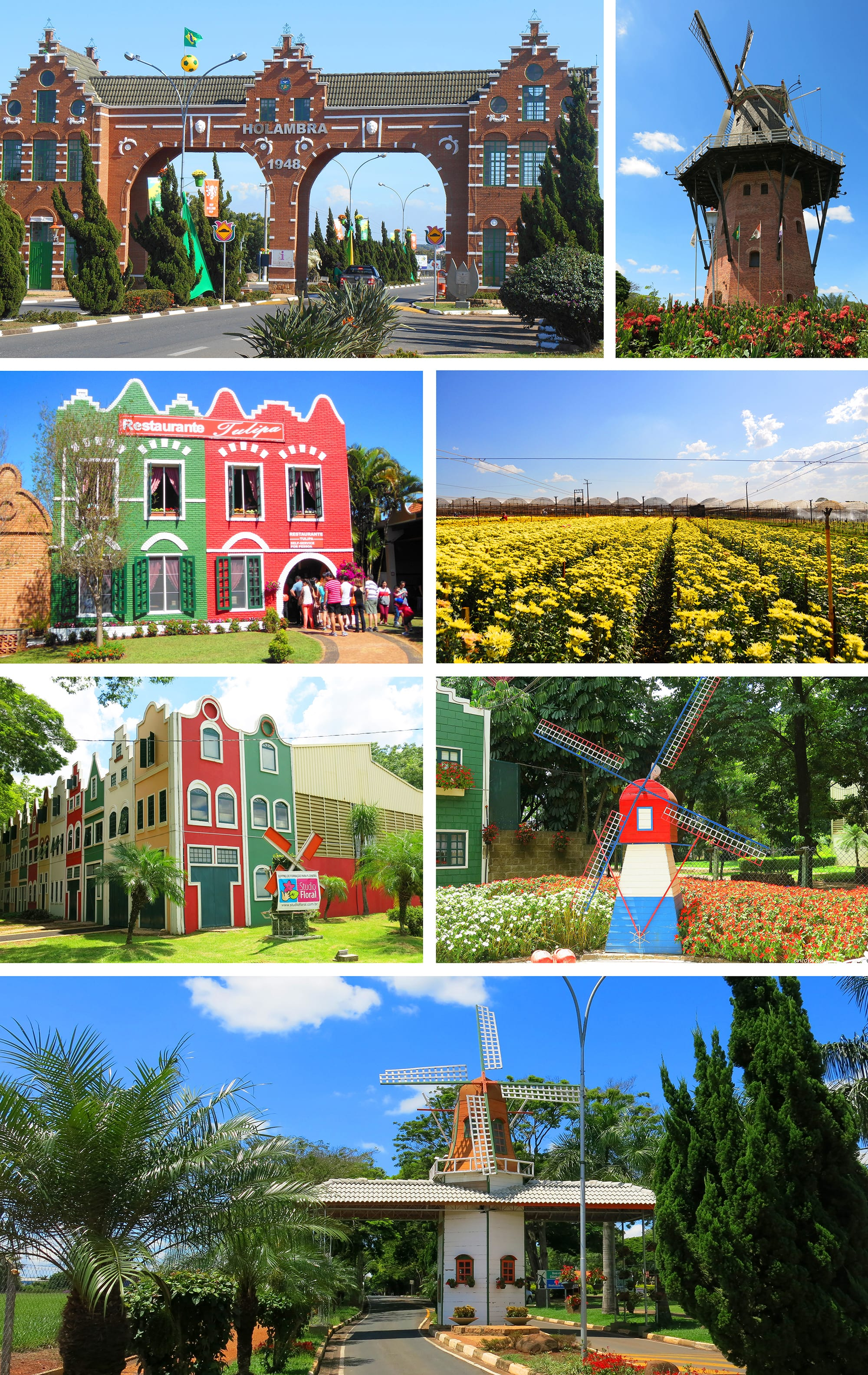
- From left to right and top to bottom: City Gate of Holambra; United Peoples Mill; Tulipa Restaurant; Sunflower Fields; Holambra's Floral Studio; Divino Espírito Santo Square; Gate of the Mill.

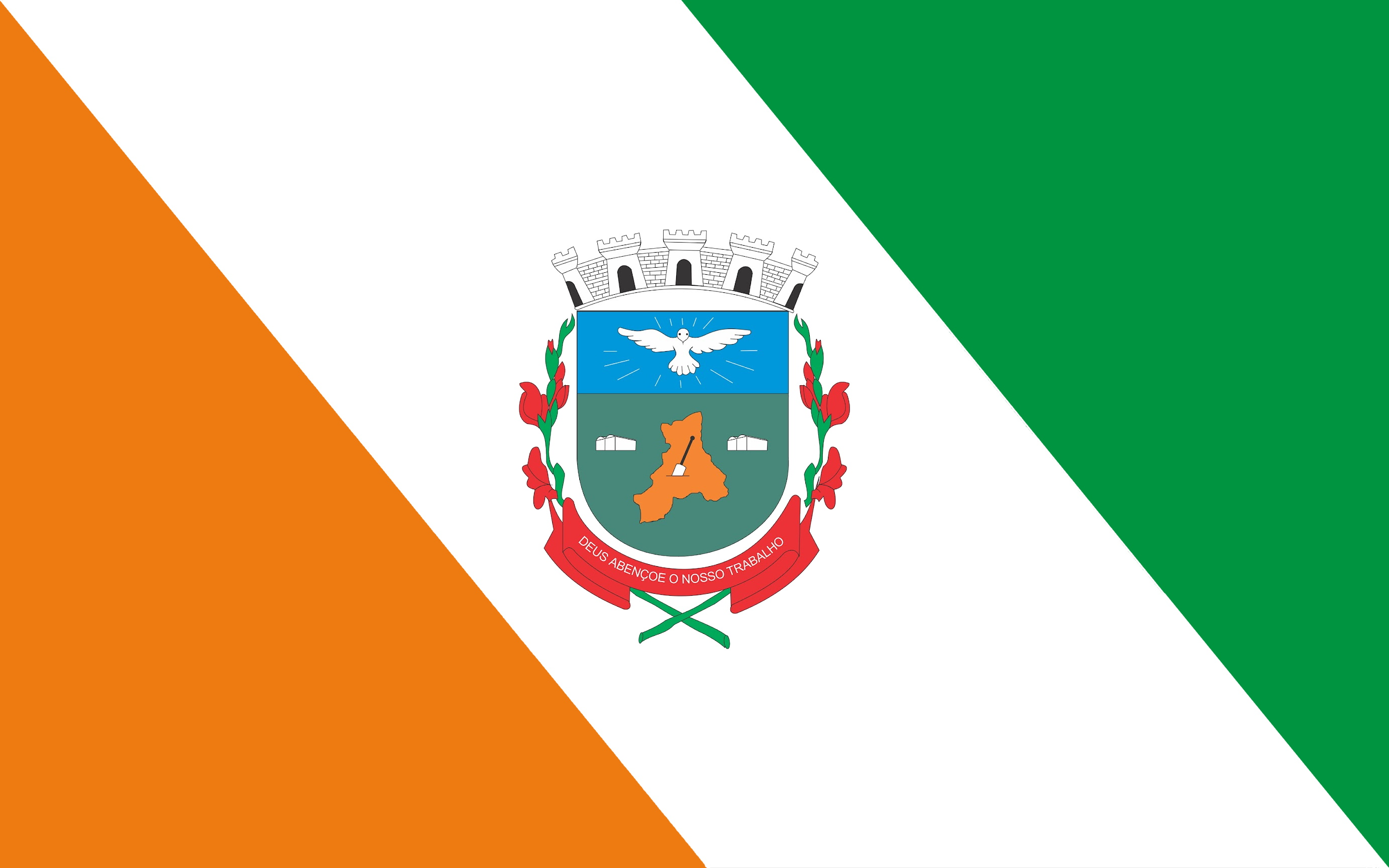
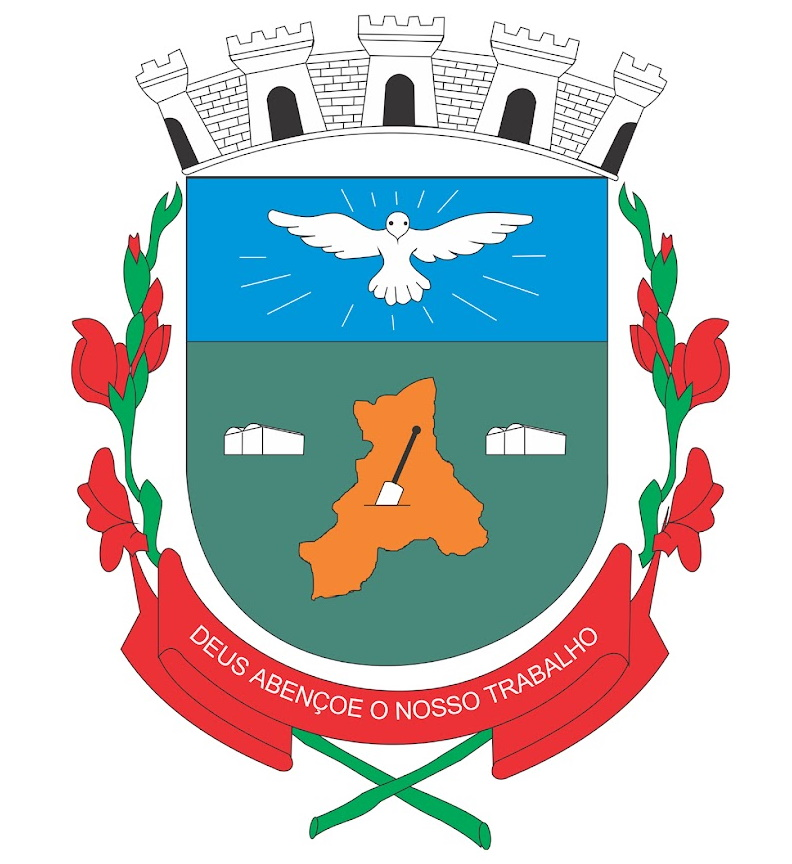
- Flag Coat of arms

- Location in São Paulo state

- Location in Brazil
- Coordinates: 22°37′59″S 47°03′20″W
- Country: Brazil
- Region: Southeast Brazil
- State: São Paulo
- Metropolitan Region: Campinas

Area
  - Total: 65.58 km^{2} (25.32 sq mi)
- Elevation: 600 m (2,000 ft)

Population (2020)
  - Total: 15,272
  - Density: 232.9/km^{2} (603.1/sq mi)
- Time zone: UTC−3 (BRT)
- Postal code: 13825-000
- Phone code: +55 19
- Website: www.holambra.sp.gov.br

Holambra (from the words Holland-America-Brazil) is a municipality in the state of São Paulo in Brazil. It is part of the Metropolitan Region of Campinas. Holambra is the largest producer of flowers and ornamental plants in Latin America, also hosting the largest spring event in the continent, the Expoflora. The population is 15,272 (2020 est.) in an area of 65.58 km. The elevation is 600m on average.

== History ==
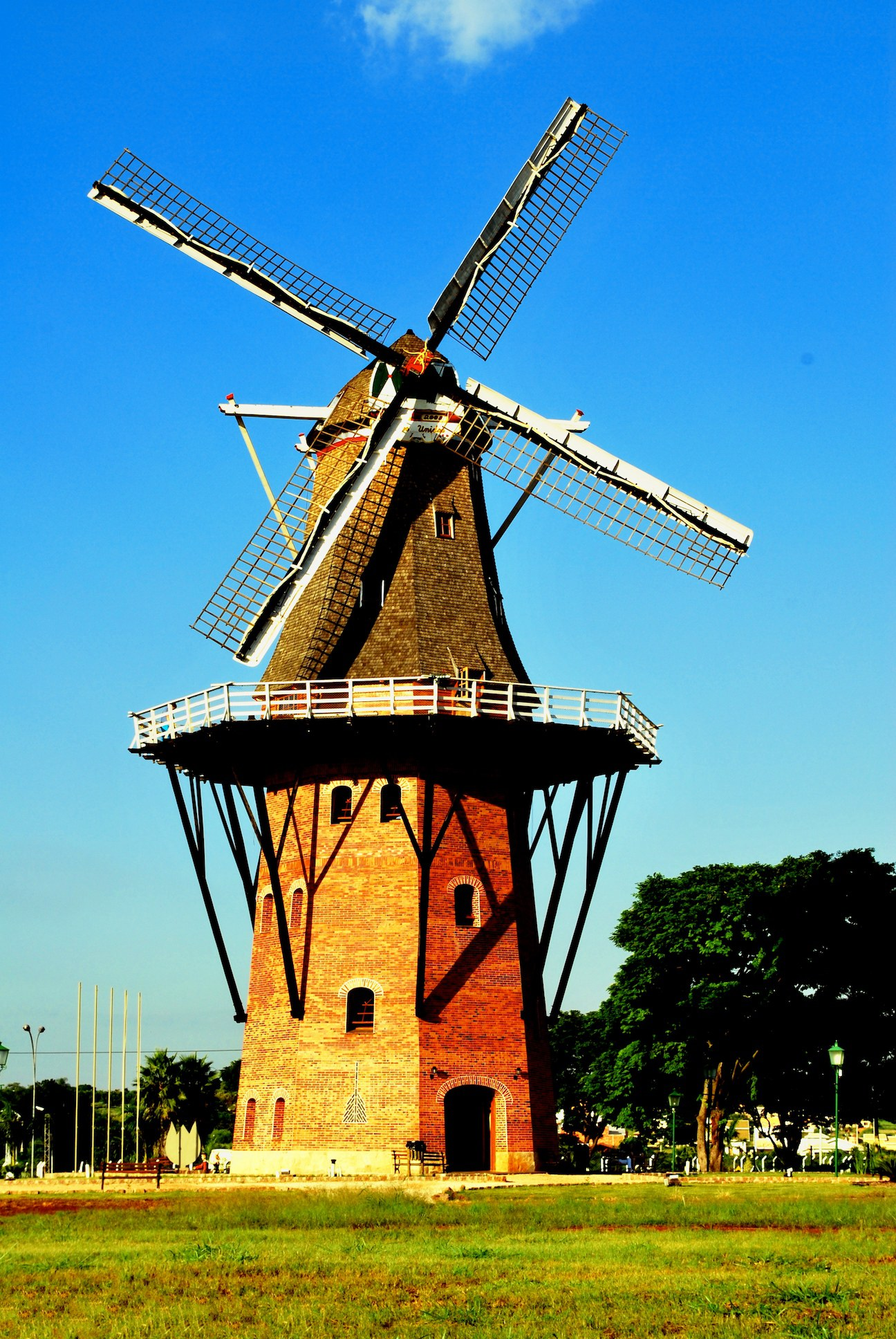
Windmill in Holambra

The colony Holambra and The Cooperativa Agropecuária de Holambra (Cattle Farming Cooperative) were founded in 1948 by Catholic Dutch immigrants at the farm Fazenda Ribeirão, situated between the cities Jaguariúna, Santo Antonio de Posse, Artur Nogueira and Cosmópolis.

After the devastation caused by World War II, the Dutch government stimulated emigration to Australia, Brazil, Canada and France. Brazil was the only nation to allow the arrival of large groups of Catholics. With the consent of the Brazilian government, the Catholic Dutch Farmers and Market-gardeners Union (Dutch: Katholieke Nederlandse Boeren- en Tuindersbond) coordinated the emigration process.

A group of approximately 650 migrants from the province of North Brabant arrived in Brazil, establishing their first colony at the farm of Fazenda Ribeirão in the state of São Paulo. Holambra I was founded on July 14, 1948.

After a referendum in 1991 where 98% of the population voted in favor of political autonomy for the area, Holambra gained city status in January 1993.

Famous for its large production of flowers and plants and for the yearly event Expoflora, Holambra receives thousands of tourists each year. In April 1998 this fact was recognized as Holambra gained the status of Estância Turística, touristic location.

== Tourism and attractions ==
Holambra is officially recognized as an Estância Turística (tourist resort) by the state of São Paulo due to its cultural preservation, flower production, and architecture, which heavily reflects its Dutch heritage. The city attracts thousands of regional and international visitors annually, particularly during the spring.

Key tourist attractions and cultural landmarks include:

- Expoflora: Held annually since 1981 during the spring flowering season, it is the largest exhibition of flowers and ornamental plants in Latin America. The festival showcases regional agricultural production and includes cultural performances, Dutch folk dancing, and culinary exhibitions.
- Moinho Povos Unidos (United Peoples Mill): A 38.5-meter-high (126 ft) traditional Dutch windmill built in 2008. It is a faithful replica of traditional windmills in the Netherlands, designed by Dutch architect Piet Schook, and operates as one of the tallest working windmills in Latin America.
- Macena Flores: A large-scale agricultural tourism site that allows visitors to tour active flower plantations, focusing on the cultivation of sunflowers, chrysanthemums, and various ornamental varieties.
- Historical Museum of Holambra: Located in the city center, the museum preserves the history of the early Dutch immigration to the region through a collection of historical photographs, machinery, replicas of early immigrant homes, and original artifacts from the founding colonists.

== Media ==
In telecommunications, the city was served by Telecomunicações de São Paulo. In July 1998, this company was acquired by Telefónica, which adopted the Vivo brand in 2012. The company is currently an operator of cell phones, fixed lines, internet (fiber optics/4G) and television (satellite and cable).

== Religion ==
Christianity is present in the city as follows:

=== Catholic Church ===
The Catholic church in the municipality is part of the Roman Catholic Diocese of Amparo.

=== Protestant Church ===
The most diverse evangelical beliefs are present in the city, mainly Pentecostal, including the Assemblies of God in Brazil (the largest evangelical church in the country), Christian Congregation in Brazil, among others. These denominations are growing more and more throughout Brazil.

== See also ==
- Castrolanda
- List of municipalities in São Paulo
- Interior of São Paulo
