= SP-63 (São Paulo highway) =

State highway in São Paulo, Brazil

SP-063

Route information
- Length: 85.730 km (53.270 mi)

Location
- Country: Brazil
- State: São Paulo

Highway system
- Highways in Brazil; Federal; São Paulo State Highways

The SP-63 is a highway in the southeastern part of the state of São Paulo in Brazil. The highway begins at the 18.6 km of the E23 in Itatiba up to Piracaia.

== Highway sections ==
- Luciano Consoline: SP-63 (around the 18.6 km and the E25) in Itatiba
- Romildo Prado: Louveira - Itatiba
- Alkindar Monteiro: Itatiba - Bragança Paulista - SP-123
- Aldo Bollini, Padre: Bragança Paulista - Piracaia
