= Itatiba =

- Flag Coat of arms

- Location of Itatiba in São Paulo state

- Location in Brazil
- Coordinates: 23°0′21″S 46°50′20″W
- Country: Brazil
- Region: Southeast
- State: São Paulo
- Metropolitan Region: Campinas

Government
  - Mayor: Thomás Antonio Capeletto de Oliveira (PSD) (2021 – 2024)

Area
  - Total: 322.269 km^{2} (124.429 sq mi)

Population (2022 Census)
  - Total: 121,590
  - Estimate (2025): 127,112
- Time zone: UTC-3 (UTC-3)
  - Summer (DST): UTC-2 (UTC-2)
- Postal Code: 13250-000
- Area code: +55 11
- Website: www.itatiba.sp.gov.br

Itatiba is a municipality in the state of São Paulo in Brazil, approximately 80 km from the state capital, also named São Paulo. It is part of the Metropolitan Region of Campinas. The population in the 2022 Census was 121,590 in an area of 322.269 km^{2} (124.429 sq mi). The average elevation is 750 m. The place's name comes from the Tupi Guarani language, and means "Many Rocks". The city is known as the "Princess of the Hill" due to its rugged terrain. According to the Industry Federation of the State of Rio de Janeiro (FIRJAN), Itatiba was the ninth city with the highest quality of life in Brazil (fourth in the state of São Paulo), presenting a FIRJAN Municipal Development Index of 0.8779 in 2018. In the 1970s, it used to known as the colonial-style furniture capital of Brazil. Itatiba also has one of the biggest thematic zoos in Latin America, the "Zooparque".

The city is also base of the famous country club and golf course Quinta da Baroneza.

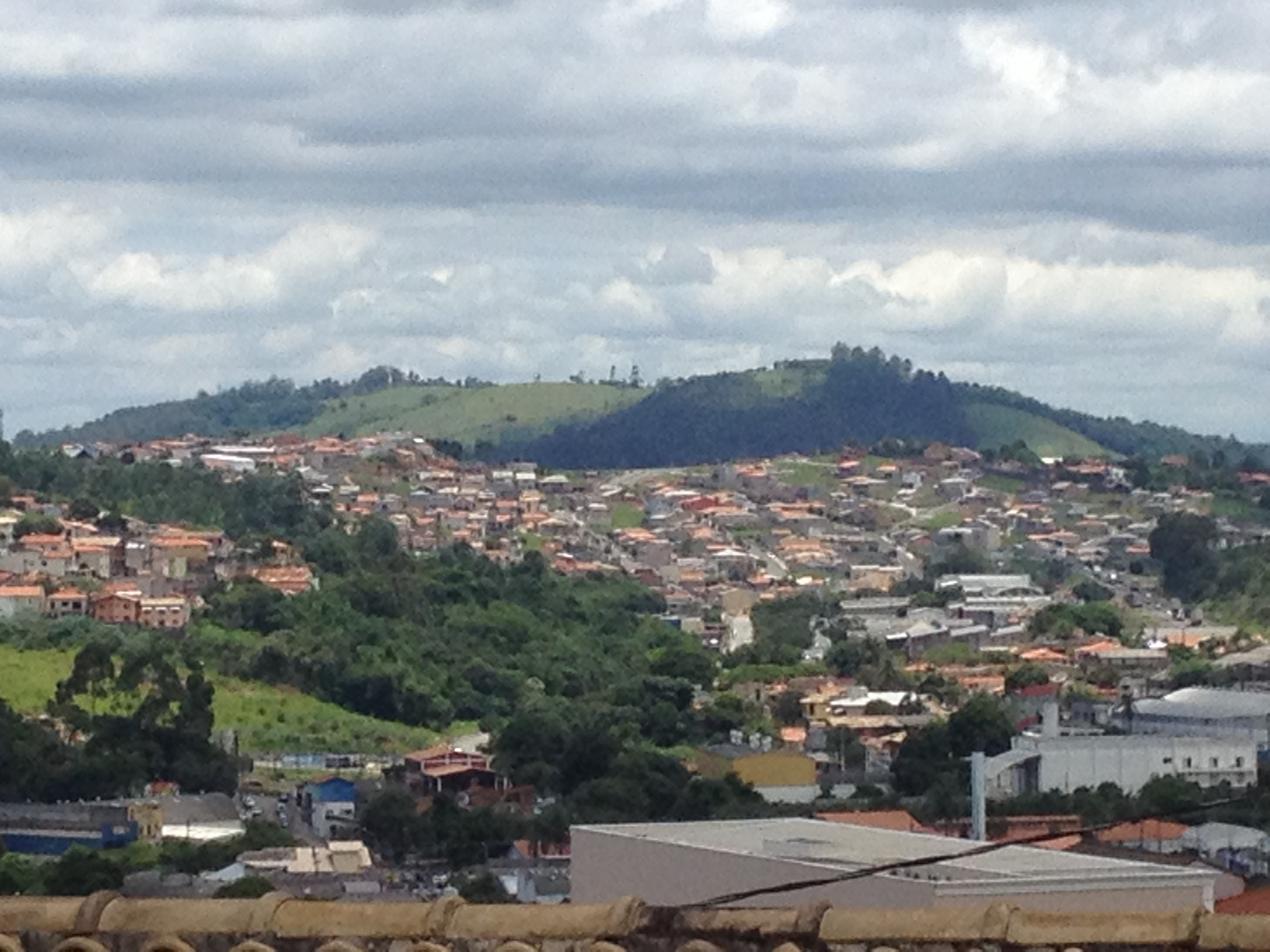
Itatiba

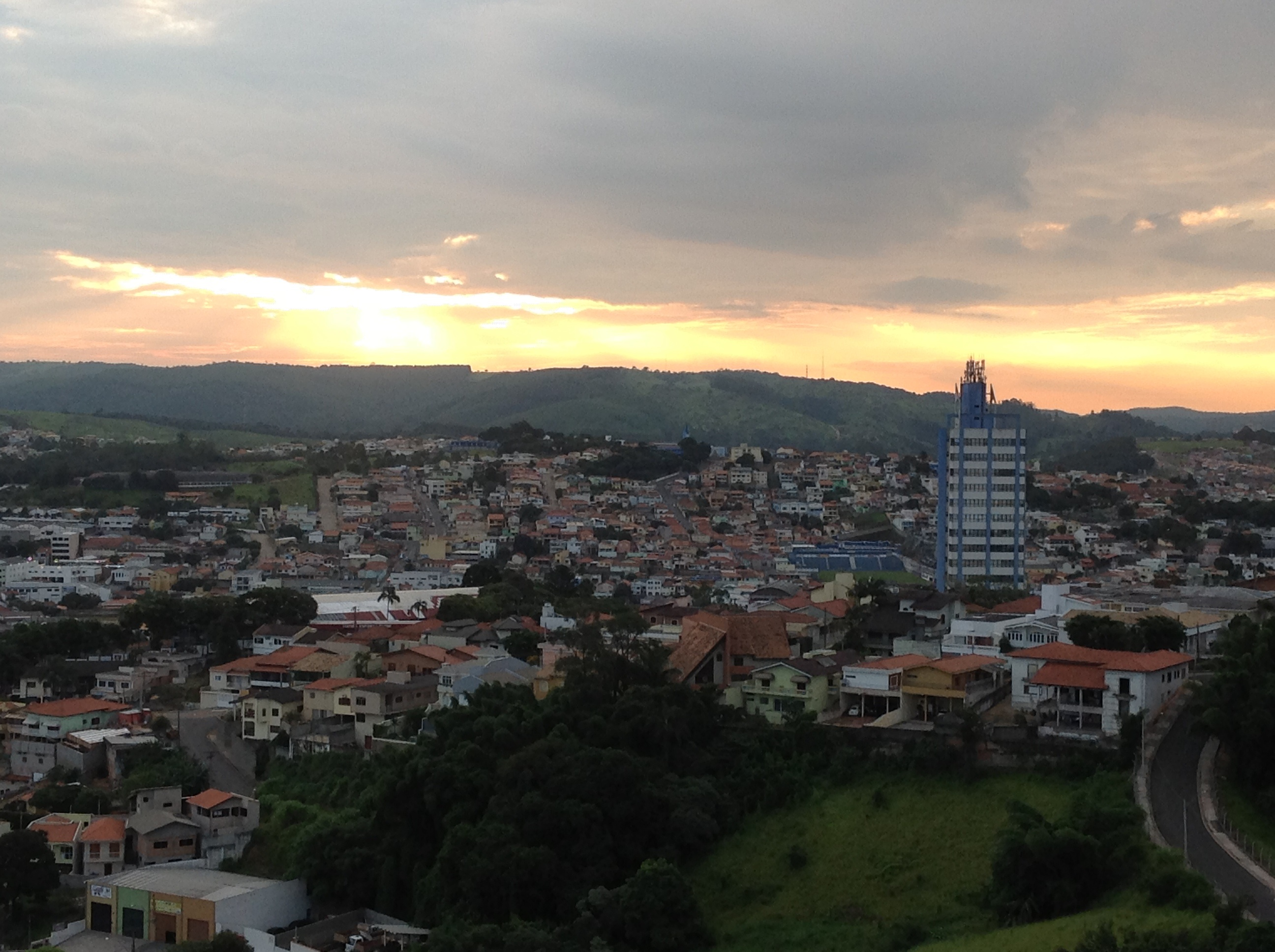
Itatiba

== Government ==
- Mayor: Thomás Antonio Capeletto de Oliveira (2021/2024)
- Deputy Mayor: Mauro Delforno (2021/2024)

== Media ==
In telecommunications, the city was served by Companhia Telefônica Brasileira until 1973, when it began to be served by Telecomunicações de São Paulo. In July 1998, this company was acquired by Telefónica, which adopted the Vivo brand in 2012.

The company is currently an operator of cell phones, fixed lines, internet (fiber optics/4G) and television (satellite and cable).

== Transportation ==
Near cities: Campinas, Valinhos, Vinhedo, Louveira, Jundiaí, Jarinú, Bragança Paulista, Morungaba and Atibaia.

=== Near Airports ===
- International Airport of Viracopos - Campinas, 50 km;
- Internacional Airport of Congonhas - São Paulo, 84 km;
- Internacional Airport of São Paulo-Guarulhos (Cumbica), 100 km;
- Airport of Bragança Paulista, 35 km;
- Airport of Jundiaí, 24 km;.

=== Public Transit Service ===
The company that provides bus transportation in Itatiba is Transporte Coletivo de Itatiba (TCI).

=== Buses between cities ===
Rápido Fênix Viação - Campinas through Valinhos (EMTU), Campinas through Louveira, Jundiaí, Morungaba, Amparo, Atibaia, Bragança Paulista. Campinas through Rodovia Dom Pedro I (EMTU), Bragança Paulista, Jundiaí, Morungaba, Amparo, Serra Negra, Lindóia, Águas de Lindóia, São Paulo through Rodovia dos Bandeirantes, São Paulo through Rodovia Anhanguera, Santos, São Vicente, Praia Grande, Mongaguá.

=== Distances ===
- 80 km from São Paulo (city)
- 34 km from Campinas
- 18 km from Jundiaí
- 30 km from Jarinu
- 35 km from Atibaia
- 35 km from Bragança Paulista
- 100 km from Jacareí
- 14 km from Vinhedo
- 10 km from Valinhos
- 18 km from Louveira
- 15 km from Morungaba

== Sister cities ==
- Tosa, Kōchi, Japan

Since August 5, 1989

- Toro, Molise, Italy

Since September 4, 2009

- Oratino, Molise, Italy

Since April 6, 2018

== See also ==
- List of municipalities in São Paulo
- Interior of São Paulo
