= Bragança Paulista =

- Municipality
- Município de Bragança Paulista; Municipality of Bragança Paulista
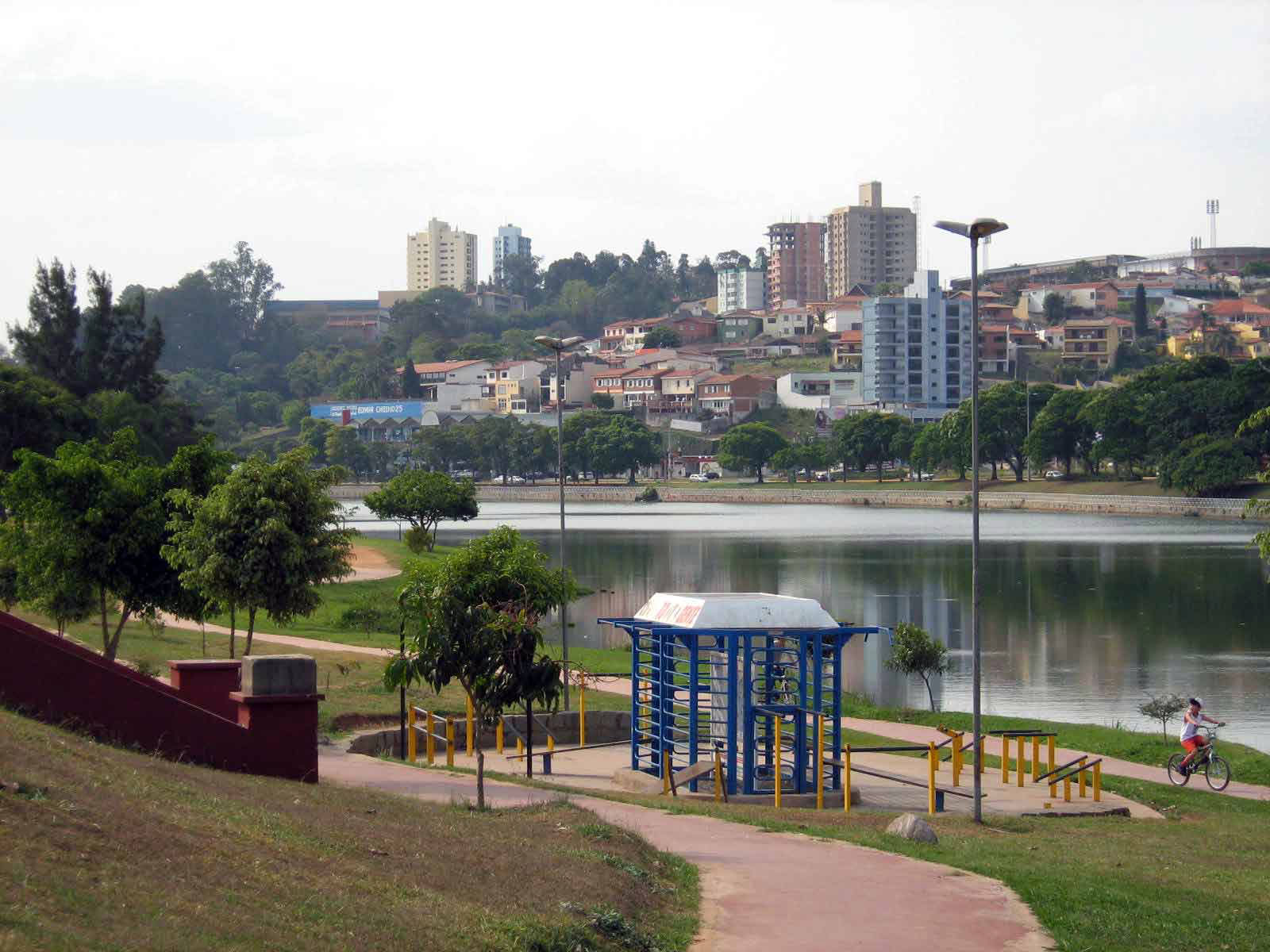
- View from Lago do Taboão

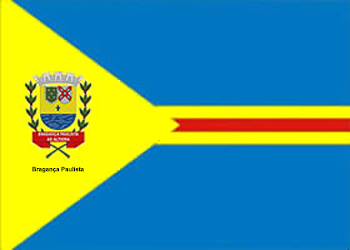
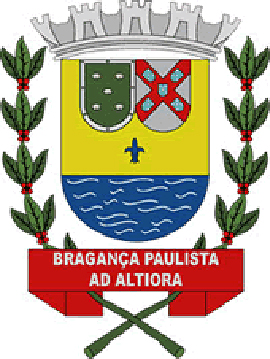
- Flag Coat of arms

- Location in São Paulo state

- Location in Brazil
- Coordinates: 22°57′11″S 46°32′32″W
- Country: Brazil
- Region: Southeast
- State: São Paulo
- Mesoregion: Macro-metropolitana Paulista
- Microregion: Bragança Paulista

Government
  - Mayor: Amauri Sodré Da Silva (DEM)

Area
  - Total: 512.6 km^{2} (197.9 sq mi)
- Elevation: 856 m (2,808 ft)

Population (2022 Brazilian Census)
  - Total: 176,811
  - Estimate (2025): 185,688
  - Density: 344.9/km^{2} (893.4/sq mi)
- Time zone: UTC-03:00 (BRT)
  - Summer (DST): UTC-02:00 (BRST)
- Postal code: 12900-000
- Area code: (+55) 11
- Website: www.braganca.sp.gov.br

Bragança Paulista is a municipality in the state of São Paulo in Brazil. The population is 176,811 (2022 Census) in an area of 512.6 km^{2} (197.9 sq mi). The elevation is 817 m.

The city is famous for its traditional sausages, with several establishments claiming to sell the "real Bragança sausage". Bragança has become a commuter town due to its proximity to São Paulo and Campinas. As a result, real estate is developing at a fast pace and several gated communities have sprung up all over town.

The city is served by Arthur Siqueira Airport dedicated to general aviation.

== History ==
The city was founded in December 15, 1763 as a settlement next to a small chapel and was originally called Conceição do Jaguari. The founders were Antonio Pires Pimentel and his wife, Ignácia da Silva Pimentel. By February 1765, the settlement was officially recognized and renamed as Distrito de Paz e Freguesia de Conceição do Jaguari. In October of 1767, the location was elevated to the condition of village and renamed as Village of New Bragança (Nova Bragança, after Bragança, Portugal). By 1856, the village of Nova Bragança was broken off from the township of Atibaia, becoming the town of Bragança.

== Geography ==
=== Climate ===
Bragança Paulista has a subtropical climate with hot summers and dry winters.

Climate data for Bragança Paulista, elevation 874 m (2,867 ft), (2001–2020 normals, extremes 2000–2015)
Month	Jan	Feb	Mar	Apr	May	Jun	Jul	Aug	Sep	Oct	Nov	Dec	Year
Record high °C (°F)	35.7 (96.3)	35.8 (96.4)	33.7 (92.7)	35.7 (96.3)	30.6 (87.1)	29.0 (84.2)	30.3 (86.5)	33.1 (91.6)	35.1 (95.2)	37.7 (99.9)	35.3 (95.5)	34.0 (93.2)	37.7 (99.9)
Mean daily maximum °C (°F)	28.6 (83.5)	29.2 (84.6)	28.2 (82.8)	26.9 (80.4)	23.6 (74.5)	23.5 (74.3)	23.2 (73.8)	24.8 (76.6)	26.2 (79.2)	27.5 (81.5)	27.2 (81.0)	28.4 (83.1)	26.4 (79.6)
Daily mean °C (°F)	23.3 (73.9)	23.7 (74.7)	22.9 (73.2)	21.3 (70.3)	18.0 (64.4)	17.5 (63.5)	17.0 (62.6)	18.4 (65.1)	20.2 (68.4)	21.7 (71.1)	21.9 (71.4)	22.9 (73.2)	20.7 (69.3)
Mean daily minimum °C (°F)	18.1 (64.6)	18.1 (64.6)	17.5 (63.5)	15.7 (60.3)	12.4 (54.3)	11.4 (52.5)	10.8 (51.4)	11.9 (53.4)	14.2 (57.6)	15.8 (60.4)	16.5 (61.7)	17.5 (63.5)	15.0 (59.0)
Record low °C (°F)	12.8 (55.0)	13.0 (55.4)	12.7 (54.9)	9.0 (48.2)	4.4 (39.9)	1.4 (34.5)	0.0 (32.0)	3.2 (37.8)	3.0 (37.4)	8.6 (47.5)	10.2 (50.4)	8.2 (46.8)	0.0 (32.0)
Average precipitation mm (inches)	252.5 (9.94)	154.1 (6.07)	156.1 (6.15)	70.2 (2.76)	58.7 (2.31)	50.9 (2.00)	43.8 (1.72)	30.9 (1.22)	52.3 (2.06)	117.2 (4.61)	164.2 (6.46)	189.5 (7.46)	1,340.4 (52.76)
Average precipitation days (≥ 1.0 mm)	20.0	14.2	14.7	8.5	8.3	7.0	5.2	4.6	7.0	12.1	14.2	17.0	132.8
Source: Centro Integrado de Informações Agrometeorológicas

== Demographics ==
Historical population (municipality)
Year	Population	%±
1920	55,719
1940	52,773	−5.3%
1950	51,623	−2.2%
1960	69,152	34.0%
1970	63,676	−7.9%
1980	84,050	32.0%
1991	108,980	29.7%
2000	125,031	14.7%
2010	146,744	17.4%
2022	176,811	20.5%

== Transport ==
=== Highways ===
- Rodovia Fernao Dias (BR-381) - São Paulo to Belo Horizonte
- Rodovia Captain Balduíno (SP-8) - Pinhalzinho, Pedra Bela, Socorro, Lindóia and Águas de Lindóia, forming part of BR 146, which connects Bragança Paulista to the city of Patos de Minas.
- Rodovia Benevenutto Moretto (SP-95) - Tuiuti, Amparo. Pedreira and Jaguariúna.
- Rodovia Alkindar M. Junqueira (SP-63) - Itatiba (Jundiaí) (Campinas)
- Rodovia Padre Aldo Boline (SP-63) - Piracaia
- João Hermenegildo Oliveira Bypass - Connects Rodovia Fernão Dias near Vargem
- Rodovia D. Pedro I (SP-65) - which connects the Rodovia Anhanguera in the Campinas section to the Rodovia Presidente Dutra in the Jacareí section. (The highway does not pass through Bragança Paulista, but cuts through the Estância de Atibaia, a neighboring city to the south).

== Media ==
In telecommunications, the city was served by Companhia Telefônica Brasileira until 1973, when it began to be served by Telecomunicações de São Paulo. In July 1998, this company was acquired by Telefónica, which adopted the Vivo brand in 2012.

The company is currently an operator of cell phones, fixed lines, internet (fiber optics/4G) and television (satellite and cable).

== Sports ==
In sports, the most notable football (soccer) team in the city is Bragantino, known as Red Bull Bragantino since 2020, after the club signed a deal with Red Bull GmbH in April 2019. The team plays at Estádio Nabi Abi Chedid, which was renamed on January 6, 2009 amid criticism from local residents. It was formerly known as Estádio Marcelo Stéfani, in honor of Marcelo Stéfani, a player and former president of the club. Bragantino was the 1990 Campeonato Paulista champion and the 1991 Campeonato Brasileiro Série A runner-up.

The area also has a golf course and residential community, Quinta da Baroneza Golf Course.

== Attractions ==
One of the town's main attractions is Taboão Lake (Lago do Taboão), which houses a number of bars and restaurants. The lakeside is crowded on weekends with many people both inside and outside the bars.

== Notable people ==
- Prika Amaral, Brazilian guitarist and front woman of thrash metal band Nervosa
- Suzane von Richthofen, Brazilian murderer.

== See also ==
- List of municipalities in São Paulo
