= Campinas metropolitan area =

Administrative division of São Paulo, Brazil

Coordinates: 22.9058°S 47.0608°W

Location of the Metropolitan Region of Campinas

The Metropolitan Region of Campinas (Portuguese: Região Metropolitana de Campinas) is an administrative division of the state of São Paulo in Brazil. It was created in 2000, and consists of the following municipalities:

- Americana
- Artur Nogueira
- Campinas
- Cosmópolis
- Engenheiro Coelho
- Holambra
- Hortolândia
- Indaiatuba
- Itatiba
- Jaguariúna
- Monte Mor
- Morungaba
- Nova Odessa
- Paulínia
- Pedreira
- Santa Bárbara d'Oeste
- Santo Antônio de Posse
- Sumaré
- Valinhos
- Vinhedo
