= Nova Odessa =

- Municipality
- Municipality of Nova Odessa
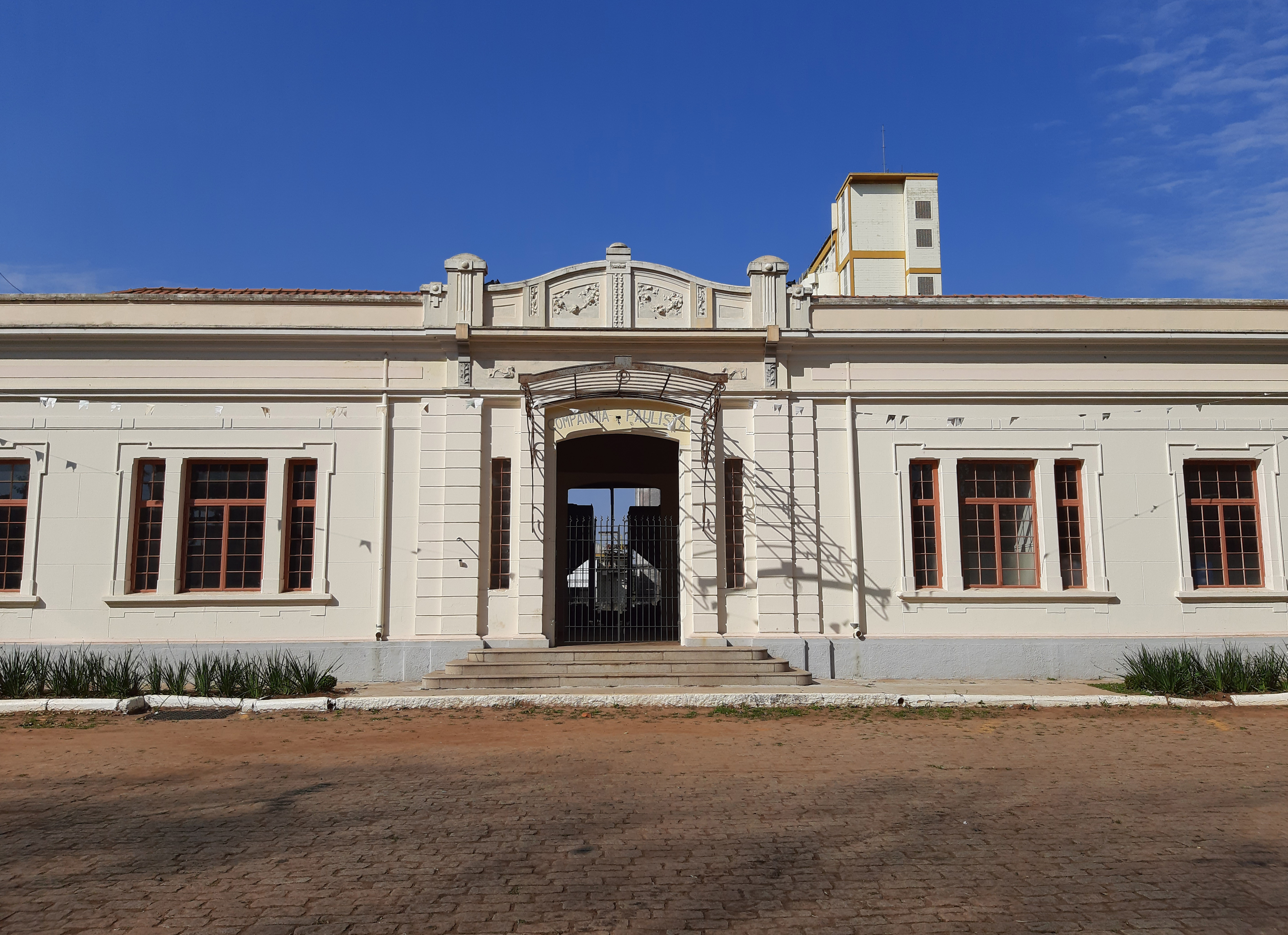
- Nova Odessa Railway Museum

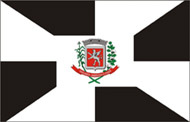
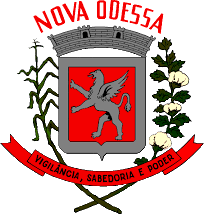
- Flag Coat of arms

- Location in São Paulo state

- Location in Brazil
- Coordinates: 22°46′48″S 47°17′56″W
- Country: Brazil
- Region: Southeast
- State: São Paulo
- Metropolitan Region: Campinas
- Founded: 24 May 1905

Area
  - Total: 73.79 km^{2} (28.49 sq mi)
- Elevation: 570 m (1,870 ft)

Population (2020)
  - Total: 62,019
  - Density: 840.5/km^{2} (2,177/sq mi)
- Time zone: UTC−3 (BRT)
- Postal Code (CEP): 13460-000

Nova Odessa (literally "New Odesa") is a Brazilian municipality in the state of São Paulo. It is part of the Metropolitan Region of Campinas. The population is 62,019 (2022 est.) in an area of 73.79 km^{2}. Nova Odessa was founded on May 24, 1905, by Carlos José de Arruda Botelho, Secretary of Agriculture of the state of São Paulo, and then settled by Jewish–Ukrainians and Latvians; Its name is due to a visit Carlos Botelho made to the city of Odesa, Ukraine, from where he brought the style of its streets, and not because the first settlers were mostly from Ukraine and Russia.

== History ==
In the early 20th century, the area of present-day Nova Odessa was classified as an uninhabited land suitable for farming. On May 24, 1905, the Brazilian government founded Nova Odessa as a "Núcleo Colonial" (the "Colonial Nuclei" were agricultural areas to where the Brazilian government wished to attract European immigrants in large-scale).

Ukrainians settled arrived in the region in 1905. However, difficulties related to farming, and soon abandoned the colony and moved to larger Brazilian cities. In late 1905, only a few Ukrainian families had remained in the nucleus. Determined to consolidate the colony, the Brazilian government sent João Gutmann to Riga, capital of Latvia, with the goal of attracting new farmers to the colony. In 1906, Nova Odessa received the first settlers from Latvia. Later, other Brazilian immigration agents were sent to Latvia and succeeded in attracting more families.

== Sister cities ==
Nova Odessa

- Jelgava, Latvia
- Odesa, Ukraine
- Agugliaro, Italy
- Santa Rita do Passa Quatro, Brazil

== Demographics ==
Historical population (municipality)
Year	Population	%±
1960	5,710	—
1970	8,336	46.0%
1980	21,891	162.6%
1991	34,063	55.6%
2000	42,071	23.5%
2010	51,242	21.8%
2022	62,019	21.0%

== Culture ==
The city maintains or supports directly in several ways a wide range of departments, programs, groups and cultural institutions. Those include the Municipal Public Library (Biblioteca Pública Municipal Professor Antônio Fernandes Gonçalves) —that has a section of books in the Latvian language. Although the city later received many people from other ethnicities, the Latvian Culture is still very noticeable and there are plans for the creation of a Center of Latvian Culture (Centro de Cultura Leta) there.

== Economy ==
The economy is based on industry, mainly textiles. The city's GDP went from R$373 million in 1999 to R$1.6 billion in 2009. With its per capita value reaching R$32,862 (2009 data) —double the national average.

== Media ==
In telecommunications, the city was served by Telecomunicações de São Paulo. In July 1998, this company was acquired by Telefónica, which adopted the Vivo brand in 2012. The company is currently an operator of cell phones, fixed lines, internet (fiber optics/4G) and television (satellite and cable).

== Climate ==
The city has a highland tropical climate, semi-humid with dry winters.

Nova Odessa

Climate chart (precipitation, max. and min. temperature)
J	F	M	A	M	J	J	A	S	O	N	D
235 28 18	207 28 18	137 28 17	51 26 15	47 24 12	37 23 10	26 23 10	29 24 11	55 26 13	121 27 15	126 28 17	191 28 17
- █ Average max. and min. temperatures in °C
- █ Precipitation totals in mm
Imperial conversion
J	F	M	A	M	J	J	A	S	O	N	D
9.3 83 64	8.1 82 64	5.4 82 63	2 80 59	1.9 75 54	1.5 73 51	1 74 50	1.1 76 52	2.2 78 56	4.8 80 59	5 82 62	7.5 82 63
- █ Average max. and min. temperatures in °F
- █ Precipitation totals in inches

== Religion ==
Christianity is present in the city as follows:

=== Catholic Church ===
The Catholic Church in the municipality is part of the Roman Catholic Diocese of Limeira.

=== Protestant Church ===
The most diverse evangelical beliefs are present in the city, mainly Pentecostal, including the Assemblies of God in Brazil (the largest evangelical church in the country), Christian Congregation in Brazil, among others. These denominations are growing more and more throughout Brazil.

== See also ==
- List of municipalities in São Paulo
- Interior of São Paulo
