= Pedra Bela =

- Municipality
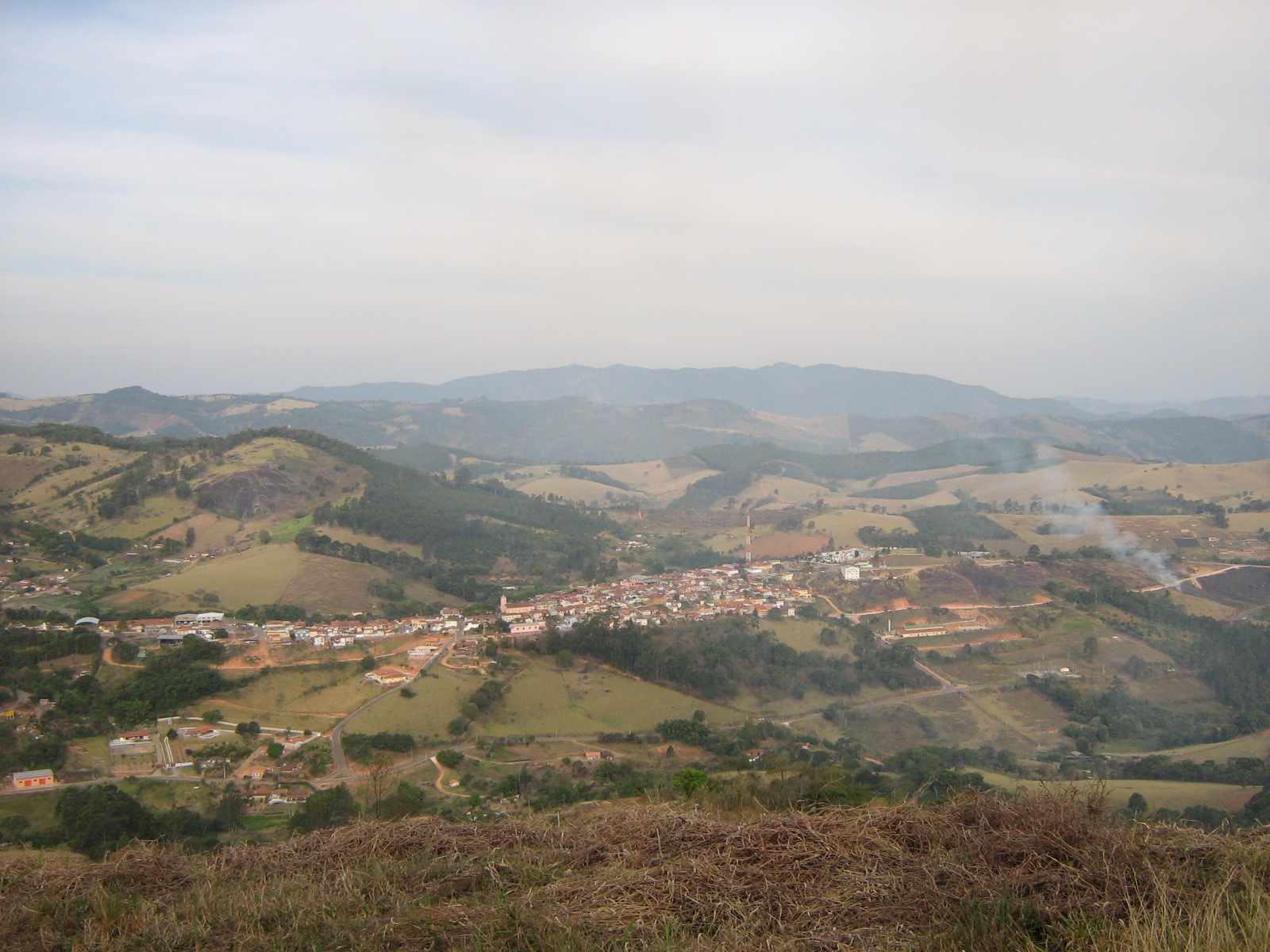
- View of Pedra Bela

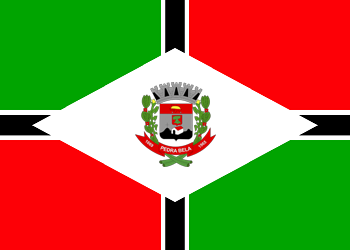
- Flag Coat of arms

- Location in São Paulo state

- Location in Brazil
- Coordinates: 22°47′35″S 46°26′36″W
- Country: Brazil
- Region: Southeast
- State: São Paulo

Area
  - Total: 159 km^{2} (61 sq mi)

Population (2020)
  - Total: 6,110
  - Density: 38.4/km^{2} (99.5/sq mi)
- Time zone: UTC−3 (BRT)

Pedra Bela is a municipality in the state of São Paulo in Brazil. The population is 6,110 (2020 est.) in an area of 159 km^{2}. The elevation is 1,120 m.

== Tourism ==
Pedra do Santuário (Sanctuary Rock) is Pedra Bela's main tourist attractions. It features a small chapel at its top and the remains of a trench used by Paulista troops as an observation post overseeing the border with Minas Gerais state during Brazil's Constitutionalist Revolution of 1932.

Pedra do Santuário also features one of Brazil's - and the world's - longest zipline, 'Mega Tirolesa', with close to 2 kilometers in length, from the rock's top to the foot of the hill where the city is located.

== Media ==
In telecommunications, the city was served by Telecomunicações de São Paulo. In July 1998, this company was acquired by Telefónica, which adopted the Vivo brand in 2012. The company is currently an operator of cell phones, fixed lines, internet (fiber optics/4G) and television (satellite and cable).

== See also ==
- List of municipalities in São Paulo
