= Morungaba =

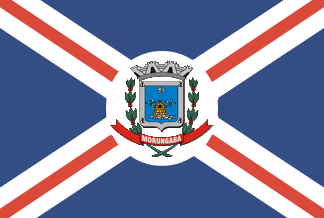
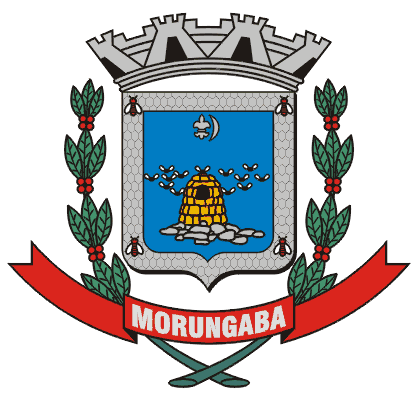
- Flag Coat of arms

- Location in São Paulo state

- Location in Brazil
- Coordinates: 22°52′48″S 46°47′30″W
- Country: Brazil
- Region: Southeast
- State: São Paulo
- Metropolitan Region: Campinas

Government
  - Mayor: Luis Fernando Miguel

Area
  - Total: 146.75 km^{2} (56.66 sq mi)

Population (2020)
  - Total: 13,781
- Time zone: UTC−3 (BRT)
- Postal Code: 13260-000
- Area code: +55 11
- Website: www.morungaba.sp.gov.br

Morungaba is a municipality in the state of São Paulo in Brazil. It is part of the Metropolitan Region of Campinas. The population is 13,781 (2020 est.) in an area of 146.75 km^{2}. The elevation is 765 m.

== Media ==
In telecommunications, the city was served by Telecomunicações de São Paulo. In July 1998, this company was acquired by Telefónica, which adopted the Vivo brand in 2012. The company is currently an operator of cell phones, fixed lines, internet (fiber optics/4G) and television (satellite and cable).

== See also ==
- List of municipalities in São Paulo
- Interior of São Paulo
