= Louveira =

- Municipality
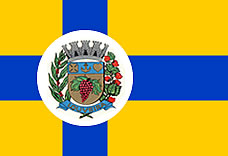
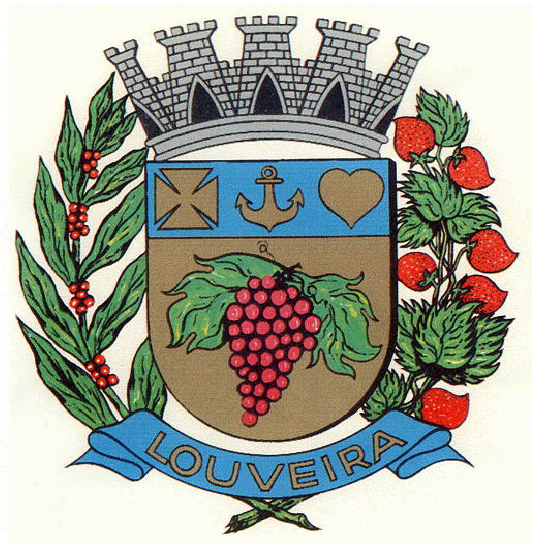
- Flag Coat of arms

- Location in São Paulo state

- Location in Brazil
- Coordinates: 23°5′11″S 46°57′2″W
- Country: Brazil
- Region: Southeast
- State: São Paulo

Area
  - Total: 55.1 km^{2} (21.3 sq mi)

Population (2020)
  - Total: 49,993
  - Density: 907/km^{2} (2,350/sq mi)
- Time zone: UTC−3 (BRT)

Louveira is a municipality in the state of São Paulo in Brazil. The population is 49,993 (2020 est.) in an area of 55.1 km^{2}. The elevation is 690 m.

== Demographics ==
Historical population (municipality)
Year	Population	%±
1970	6,430	—
1980	10,322	60.5%
1991	16,259	57.5%
2000	23,903	47.0%
2010	37,125	55.3%
2022	51,847	39.7%

== Media ==
In telecommunications, the city was served by Telecomunicações de São Paulo. In July 1998, this company was acquired by Telefónica, which adopted the Vivo brand in 2012. The company is currently an operator of cell phones, fixed lines, internet (fiber optics/4G) and television (satellite and cable).

== See also ==
- List of municipalities in São Paulo
