= Pedreira, São Paulo =

Pedreira
- Municipality
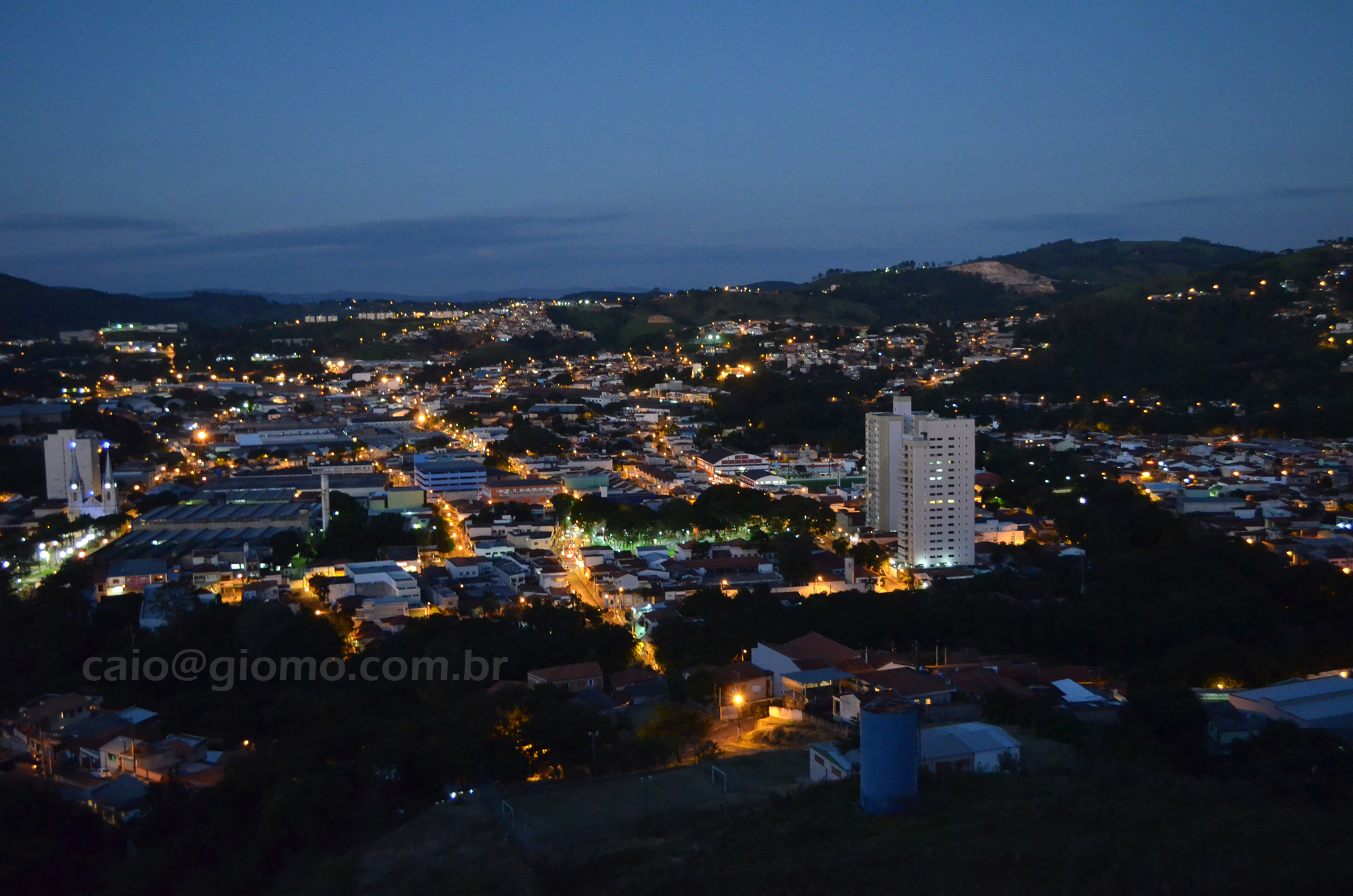

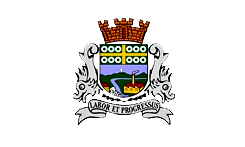
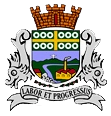
- Flag Coat of arms

- Location in São Paulo state

- Location in Brazil
- Coordinates: 22°44′31″S 46°54′05″W
- Country: Brazil
- Region: Southeast Brazil
- State: São Paulo
- Metropolitan Region: Campinas

Area
  - Total: 108.82 km^{2} (42.02 sq mi)
- Elevation: 590 m (1,940 ft)

Population (2020)
  - Total: 48,463
  - Density: 445.35/km^{2} (1,153.5/sq mi)
- Time zone: UTC−3 (BRT)

Pedreira (Portuguese for quarry) is a municipality in the state of São Paulo in Brazil. It is part of the Metropolitan Region of Campinas. The population is 48,463 (2020 est.) in an area of 108.82 km^{2} (42.02 sq mi). The elevation is 590 m. The town is located 138 km from the capital. It is called "Flor da Porcelana" (Porcelain Flower) because of its porcelain related commerce. Pedreira was founded in 1896. It is linearly distributed on Jaguari River banks. The name of the town comes from the name "Pedro", present in the most male members of the founder's family, Colonel João Pedro de Godoy Moreira. Pedreira offers as main attraction its large porcelain, glasses, wood crafts, aluminium, decoration pieces commerce, with shops especialized in tourist service.

== Media ==
In telecommunications, the city was served by Companhia Telefônica Brasileira until 1973, when it began to be served by Telecomunicações de São Paulo. In July 1998, this company was acquired by Telefónica, which adopted the Vivo brand in 2012.

The company is currently an operator of cell phones, fixed lines, internet (fiber optics/4G) and television (satellite and cable).

== Religion ==
Christianity is present in the city as follows:

=== Catholic Church ===
The Catholic church in the municipality is part of the Roman Catholic Diocese of Amparo.

=== Protestant Church ===
The most diverse evangelical beliefs are present in the city, mainly Pentecostal, including the Assemblies of God in Brazil (the largest evangelical church in the country), Christian Congregation in Brazil, among others. These denominations are growing more and more throughout Brazil.

== See also ==
- List of municipalities in São Paulo
- Interior of São Paulo
