= Santo Antônio de Posse =

- Municipality
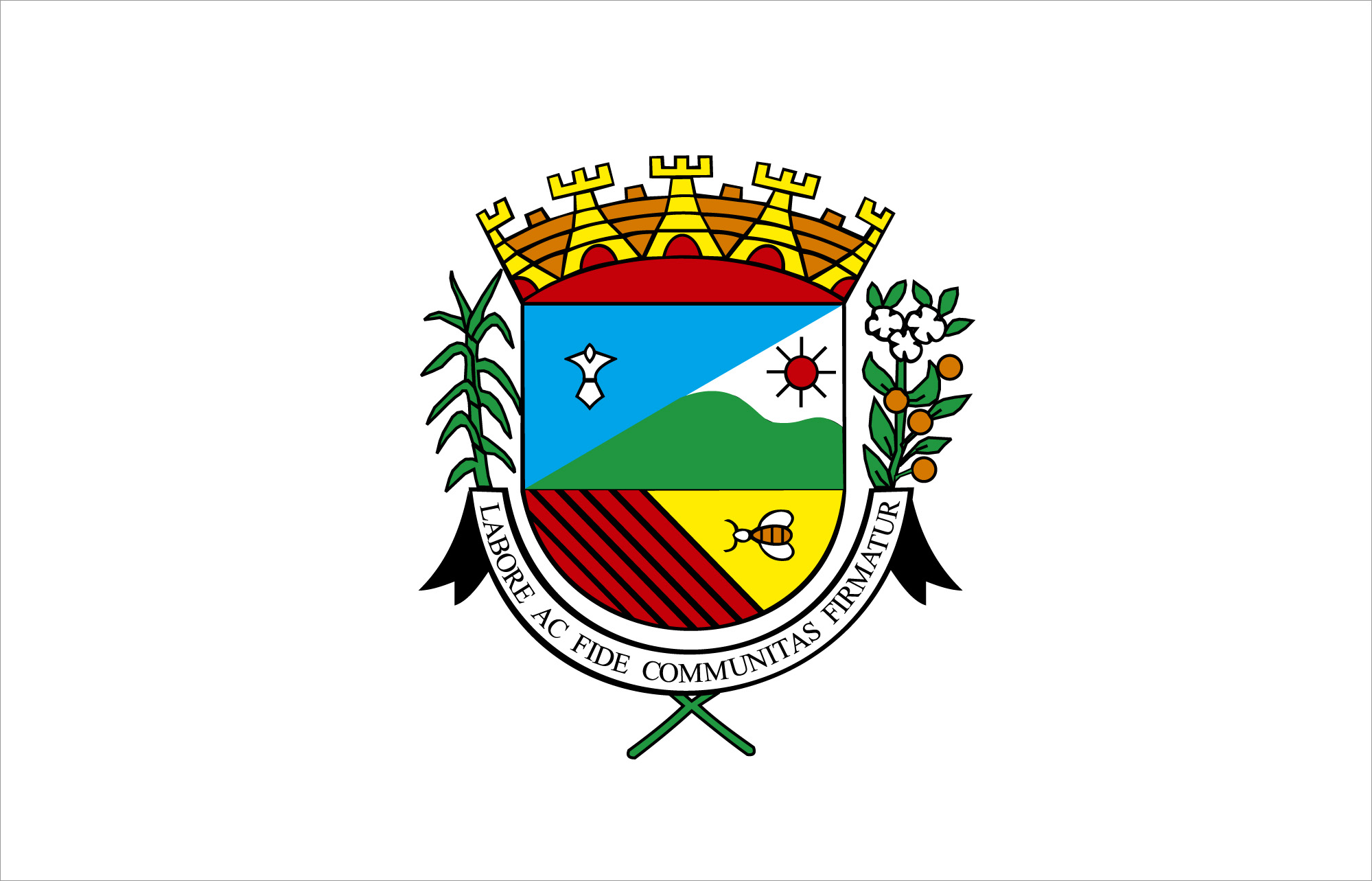
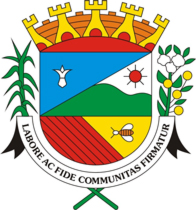
- Flag Coat of arms
- Motto: Posse para todos
- Location of Santo Antonio de Posse

- Location within Brazil
- Coordinates: 22°36′22″S 46°55′10″W
- Country: Brazil
- State: São Paulo
- Metropolitan Region: Campinas
- Founded: June 13, 1850

Government
  - Mayor: Maurício Dimas Comisso (PRB)

Area
  - Total: 154.13 km^{2} (59.51 sq mi)
- Elevation: 695 m (2,280 ft)

Population (2020)
  - Total: 23,529
  - Density: 152.66/km^{2} (395.38/sq mi)
- Time zone: UTC−3 (BRT)
- Postal Code: 13830-000
- Area code: +55 19
- Website: www.pmsaposse.sp.gov.br

Santo Antônio de Posse is a municipality in the state of São Paulo in Brazil. It is part of the Metropolitan Region of Campinas. The population is 23,529 (2020 est.) in an area of 154.13 km^{2}. The elevation is 695 m. Nearby cities are Jaguariuna, Campinas, Americana, Holambra, Amparo, Serra Negra, Artur Nogueira, Mogi Mirim, Mogi Guacu, Cosmopolis, Espirito Santo do Pinhal.

== Media ==
In telecommunications, the city was served by Telecomunicações de São Paulo. In July 1998, this company was acquired by Telefónica, which adopted the Vivo brand in 2012. The company is currently an operator of cell phones, fixed lines, internet (fiber optics/4G) and television (satellite and cable).

== Religion ==
Christianity is present in the city as follows:

=== Catholic Church ===
The Catholic church in the municipality is part of the Roman Catholic Diocese of Amparo.

=== Protestant Church ===
The most diverse evangelical beliefs are present in the city, mainly Pentecostal, including the Assemblies of God in Brazil (the largest evangelical church in the country), Christian Congregation in Brazil, among others. These denominations are growing more and more throughout Brazil.

== See also ==
- List of municipalities in São Paulo
- Interior of São Paulo
