= Vinhedo =

Municipality in São Paulo, Brazil

- Municipality
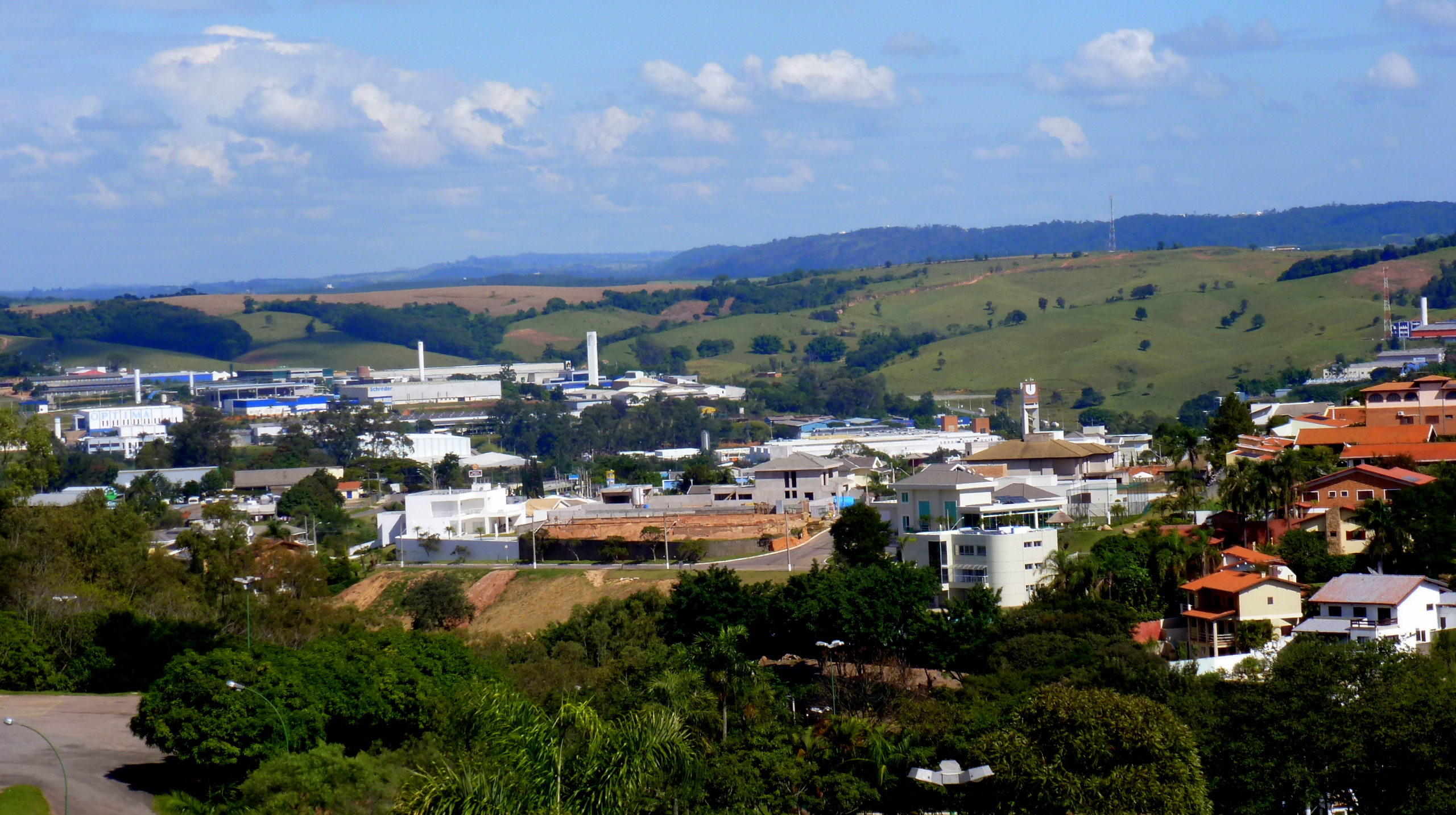
- View of Vinhedo.

- Flag Coat of arms
- Nickname: Cidade da Uva (Grape City)
- Location of Vinhedo in São Paulo

- Location of Vinhedo in Brazil
- Coordinates: 23°01′48″S 46°58′30″W
- Country: Brazil
- Region: Southeast
- State: São Paulo
- Metropolitan Region: Campinas
- Founded: December, 1948

Government
  - Mayor: Dario Pacheco de Morais (PTB)

Area
  - Total: 81.60 km^{2} (31.51 sq mi)
- Elevation: 725 m (2,379 ft)

Population (2022)
  - Total: 76.540
  - Density: 945.52/km^{2} (2,448.9/sq mi)
- Demonym: Vinhedense
- Time zone: UTC−3 (BRT)
- Postal code: 13280-000
- Area code: +55 19
- Website: vinhedo.sp.gov.br

Vinhedo (Portuguese pronunciation: [viˈɲedu]) is a municipality in the state of São Paulo in Brazil. It is part of the Metropolitan Region of Campinas. The population in 2020 was 80,111 and its area is 81.60 km^{2} (31.51 mi^{2}). It has a population density of 981 inhabitants per square kilometer. The elevation is 777 m (2,549 ft). Vinhedo is 96% urbanized and It was founded in 1949.

Vinhedo is ranked 13th of the 5,565 municipalities in the 2010 Brazilian Municipal Development Index (FMDI), and 6th among the municipalities in the state of São Paulo. It had a per capita income of $638.17 in 2010 and an extreme poverty rate (defined as under $30 per year) of 0.13%. The municipality has made significant progress in the implementation of the digital city concept (11th in the state of São Paulo, which is defined as the level of digital infrastructure and services available to residents.

== History ==
The region of the São Paulo plateau was inhabited by several indigenous groups, some from the coast, who sought refuge from the wars and slavery of the Iberian settlers. Others, such as Tupi-Guaranys and Jés (like the Kaigang and the southern Kayapó), had lived in the region since before colonization.

With the arrival of Europeans to the South American continent, the region was crossed by the "Bandeiras", who occupied lands considered unexplored and hunted Indians for slave labor, as well as looking for natural resources like noble woods, gold and precious stones, during century XVII. For this, the indigenous tribes were decimated or expelled from the region. African slaves were introduced to forcefully aid the Flags or to work on the newly created subsistence crops that were forming on the way to Goyaz.

At the end of the 19th century coffee farms settled in the northern region of Jundiaí county - many of them taking advantage of former farms that had been producing sugar and brandy since the 18th century. All the work was done by black slaves. White laborers, mainly European immigrants sponsored by the government and by farmers, occupied the slots left by the slaves after the abolition.

Intense commerce between the coffee-growing region and the capital of São Paulo moved troops of mules by the Old Road of Campinas. Departing from São Paulo towards the interior of Brazil, great cities were created every 50 kilometers, and between one and another, sometimes, a temporary stopping point.

Between Jundiaí and Campinas, a landing of tropeiros was created naturally in the middle of 1620 and, for usufruct of these, a small subsistence plantation, a "rocinha". One of the first properties installed in the place would later become the well known Waterfall Farm, which would eventually transform a senzala in Quilombo decades after slavery.

Located in the valley between Fazenda Cachoeira and Estrada Velha de Campinas, already popularly called Estrada da Boiada, Rocinha became, from 1840, a small village where black slaves cultivated coffee, which soon would be sold to cities and later, the capital of São Paulo. With the abolition, the former black slaves were released and, without educational instruction or labor opportunities, migrated to Minas Gerais and the capital of São Paulo. Few remained in the small town whose population constituted Portuguese, Spanish, German, French, Arab, American and mainly Italian immigrants. Rocinha passed to the condition of Vila and District of Peace belonging to Jundiaí on October 31, 1908, by law promulgated by the then President of the State of São Paulo, Dr. Albuquerque Lins.

At this time, with the arrival of more Italian immigrants to supply the lack of manpower, viticulture was introduced in the then town of Rocinha as the primary agricultural product, since the price of the coffee of the region suffered a sensible decrease with the expansion of the production in the cities of the center-west of the state of São Paulo and the construction of the Companhia Mogiana railroad, which made easy connection between the north of the state and the port of Santos, rendering obsolete coffee production of in Rocinha.

The viticulture became the basis of the local economy. Throughout the district are spread the grape plantations for the production of wines, vinegars, and sweets. Rocinha then became known not only as a "stopping" post and signaled the rise of the town as a regional economic and political player.

In 1916 the owner of a farm on the Estrada da Boiada, about two kilometers from the railroad, hired a worker to enlarge a well for capturing or reserving water, approximately 25 meters deep.

During the work, an internal collapse partially buried the worker, who was trapped at the bottom of the building. For five days rescue was attempted, using all means available at the time. The rescue was widely reported at the time. The man did not survive, but the event help familiarize the name of the village.

In the 1920s the first industries began to arrive in the district, as an alternative to the high operating costs in the municipalities of Jundiaí and Campinas. The district no longer had aspects of a simple village, and a movement began to formalize the separation of the town from surrounding population centers.

In 1948, a plebiscite formalized the town of Rocinha and its detachment of the administration of Jundiaí. On April 2, 1949, Rocinha became a municipality, with names such as Parreiral, Videiral, Vines, Vinhalândia and the chosen one, Vinhedo being suggested for the new city. Its inhabitants are called Vinhedenses.

From 1950 onwards, the Festivity of the Grape of Vinhedo began, on the initiative of Favorino Carlos Marrone (who years later became a Monsignor), the parish priest of the Sant'Ana Parish, in the region that today comprises the center of the municipality.

On August 9, 2024, Voepass Linhas Aéreas Flight 2283 crashed in Vinhedo. All 62 people aboard perished.

== Geography ==
Vinhedo is the 101st municipality with the highest population, from the most populous state of Brazil, São Paulo, at latitude 23 ° 1'48 "south and longitude 46 ° 58'30" W. The total area of the municipality is 81,742 km^{2}, according to the Brazilian Institute of Geography and Statistics (IBGE), being the 5289th largest in territorial extension of the Brazil, and 603th largest in extension of the state of São Paulo. Of the entire area of the municipality, 968,3248 km^{2} are of urban areas (2000).

Vinhedo has an average altitude of 720 meters. The culminating point of the municipality is the Christ the Redeemer, being replica of Christ the Redeemer with 720 meters of altitude above the level of the sea, located in Rodovia Edenor João Taca, in the Observatory of Vineyard, where there is also the Monastery of Saint Benedict.

=== Metropolitan region ===
The process of conurbation under the region has been building a metropolis whose center is in the city of Campinas, having several municipalities, such as Sumaré, Indaiatuba, Hortolândia, Santa Bárbara d'Oeste, Valinhos, Itatiba and Paulínia, as well as Vinhedo. The Metropolitan Region of Campinas (RMC) was created by state law 870, dated June 19, 2000, and currently is by 19 municipalities, being a ninth largest urban agglomeration in Brazil, with 2,798,477 inhabitants. It is one of the most important in the Brazilian Brazilian world and accounts for 2.7% of the national gross domestic product and 7.83% of the gross domestic product of São Paulo, or about 77.7 billion reais per year.

Under the sign of "Expanded Metropolitan Complex", which exceeds 29 million inhabitants, approximately 75 percent of the population of the entire state of São Paulo. The metropolitan regions of Campinas and São Paulo have already formed a megalopolis (or macrometropole) of the southern hemisphere, totaling 65 municipalities that house more than 12% of the Brazilian population.

==== Adjacent municipalities and metropolitan region ====
Vinhedo limits with the municipalities of Itupeva, Itatiba, Valinhos, Louveira and Jundiaí.

=== Ecology and environment ===
Most of the original vegetation that it had in the city, the Atlantic Forest, was devastated. Like other 13 municipalities in the Metropolitan Region of Campinas, the municipality suffers severe environmental stress. Vinhedo, together with Campinas and Artur Nogueira, is considered one of the areas most subject to floods and silting and accounts for less than 5% of vegetal cover.

To try to reverse this picture, several projects have been and are being carried out and planned, such as the construction of ecological corridors. There are also several environmental projects to combat the destruction of riparian forests located on the banks of the Cachoeira, Capivari and Pinheirinho rivers, which have a high pollution index of their waters. Presently, it is important to preserve the Jayme Ferragut Municipal Park in Vinhedo. The park has an area of 877 m^{2}, being one of the main parks of the RMC.

In the vinhedense original flora, there is a predominance of trees such as the pink jequitibá (Cariniana legalis), the pink peroba (Aspidosperma polyneuron) and the jatobá (Hymenaea courbaril), which reach 25 meters in height. There is an arboreal stratum of 15 to 18 meters high, composed of several species such as the white jequitibá (Cariniana estrellensis), the cedar-rose (Cedrela fissilis), the ivory (Balfourodendron riedellianum) and the fig trees (Ficus ennormis, Ficus glabra and Ficus guaranítica).

Fauna include the great-toed woodworm (Habia rubica), the rendeira (Manacus manacus) and the tangara (Chiroxiphia caudata); howler monkeys (Alouatta fusca) and prey monkeys (Cebus apella); the white ear possum (Didelphis albiventris), the black-ear possum (Didelphis marsupialis), the thick-tailed opossum (Lutreolina crassicaudata) and the quartz (Gracilinanus microtarsus); (Sylvilagus brasiliensis), the cingling (Sciurus ingrami), the hedgehog (Coendou villosus), myocastor coypus, the capybara (Hydrochaeris hydrochaeris), prea (Cavea aperea) and teiú (Tupinambis merianae). There is also the wild dog (Cerdocyon thous), the mallard (Felis yagouaroundi), the hand-peeled (Procyon cancrivorous), the grison (Galictis), the jararaca (Bothrops jararaca) and the poppy (Dipsas indica).

=== Climate ===
The climate of Vinhedo is considered tropical at altitude, (of the Cwa type) in the climatic classification of Köppen-Geiger, according to the Center of Meteorological and Climatic Applied to Agriculture (CEPAGRI) of the State University of Campinas (Unicamp). With decreases of rains in winter and average annual temperature of 18,0 °C, having dry and mild winters and rainy summers with moderately high temperatures. The warmest month, January, has an average temperature of 21.6 °C, and the coldest, July, of 15.2 °C. Autumn and spring are transition seasons. The average rainfall is approximately 1,404 millimeters (mm) annually, concentrated between October and March, with January being the month of greatest precipitation (191 mm). The precipitations occur mainly in the form of rain and, sometimes of hail, being able to be of intense intensity and still accompanied by rays and thunderstorms. The air humidity is relatively high, with monthly averages between 60% and 80%, with an annual average of 71%, and may be below 30%, mainly in the afternoon, during the winter, which contributes to the increase of burned in hills and bushes, mainly in the rural area, as well as for deforestation and the release of pollutants into the atmosphere, further damaging air quality.

According to the records of the Agronomic Institute of Campinas, the year with the lowest rainfall was 1944, with 836.5 mm. Other years with precipitations below 1 000 mm were 1924, 1978, 1921 and 1968, while the year with the highest precipitation was 1983, with 2 112 mm, due to an intense activity of the El Niño meteorological phenomenon. Between 1890 and 2004 there were 41 records of frosts, one of the most recent being on July 18, 2000, when the minimum temperature reached 2.2 °C. Occasionally there are also episodes of strong wind, with gusts above 100 km/h, and there were records of tornado formation in the municipality on May 4, 2001, and March 9, 2008.

According to data from the National Institute of Meteorology (INMET), for the period from 1961 to 1967 (until 31 and August) and 1971 to 1981 (until March 31) the lowest temperature recorded in Vinhedo was 0.6 °C in August 1965 and July 18, 1975, and highest reached 37.7 °C on September 21, 1961. The largest accumulated precipitation in 24 hours was 106.1 mm on October 22, 1963. The lowest air humidity was 15%, on September 9, 1963.

== Demography ==
Historical population (municipality)
Year	Population	%±
1950	8,525	—
1960	13,174	54.5%
1970	12,338	−6.3%
1980	21,647	75.4%
1991	33,612	55.3%
2000	47,215	40.5%
2010	63,611	34.7%
2022	76,540	20.3%

Its estimated population in 2017 was 75,129 inhabitants, of which 61,688 live in the urban area and 1,997 in the rural area. There are 43,804 voters and 94 polling stations. Of this total 98.2% of the population are in urban area, and 1.8% of the population are in rural area.

- Human Development Index (HDI-M): 0.817 (very high)
- HDI-M Income: 0.840 (very high)
- HDI-M Longevity: 0.878 (very high)
- HDI-M Education: 0.739 (high)

(Source: DATA/IBGE)

=== Socioeconomic conditions ===
In 2016, the average monthly salary was 3.4 Brazilian minimum wages. The proportion of employed persons in relation to the total population was 53.4%. In comparison with the other municipalities of the state, it was ranked 23rd of 645 and 13th of 645, respectively. Already in comparison with cities of the whole country, it was ranked 81st of 5570 and 39th of 5570, respectively. Considering households with monthly incomes of up to half a minimum wage per person, it had 28.2% of the population in these conditions, which ranked it 519th of 645 among the cities of the state and 5001st of 5570 among the cities of Brazil.

=== Ethnic composition ===
According to the 2010 IBGE Census, about 58.26% of the people who now reside in the municipality were born in other cities or states of the country. At the time of the Census, there were only 1.23% residents of the municipality. About 670 foreigners and another 122 naturalized. The same Census showed that approximately 73.28% of the population declared themselves White, 21.88% Mixed, 3.8% Black and 0.12% Indigenous. Another 0.8% declared themselves Orientals, and 0.12% declared Mestiza, of other races / colors or did not respond. According to the same survey, about 11.4% of the population is 60 years old or older. Approximately 16% of the population of Vinhedo has some type of motor, sensory or mental limitation. The public health system of the municipality also undergoes restructuring and has points approved and disapproved by its inhabitants.

=== Religion ===
Several religions are present in the city. Although it has developed on an eminently Catholic social matrix, both due to colonization and immigration, there are a number of different Protestant denominations, as well as the practice of spiritism, among others. In recent decades, Protestantism has grown in the city. According to data from the 2017 census conducted by IBGE, the Campinas Metropolitan Area population is composed of: 41,419 Catholics (65.11%), 14,389 Protestants (35.00%), and 1,880 Spiritists (11.00%).

==== Catholicism ====
Vinhedo belongs to the Archdiocese of Campinas. The city has four parishes, namely Sant'Ana Parish (Center), San Sebastião Parish (Bairro Nova Vinhedo), Nossa Senhora de Lourdes Parish (Neighborhood Capela) and São Francisco de Assis Parish (Vila Joao XXIII). In 2010, the population of Catholics in Vinhedo was 41,419, according to IBGE.

==== Protestantism ====
The city has several Protestant or Reformed creeds, such as the Lutheran Church, the Presbyterian Church, the Methodist Church, the Anglican Episcopal Church of Brazil, and various Baptist churches. In addition to the most diverse evangelical creeds, such as the Evangelical Community of Our Land, the Maranatha Christian Church, the Assemblies of God churches, the Seventh-day Adventist Church, the World Church of God's Power, the Universal Church of the Kingdom of God, the Christian Congregation in Brazil, the Church of the City of Vinhedo, among others. According to IBGE, in 2017 35.00% of the population were Protestant. Of this total, 12.76% are from evangelical churches of Pentecostal origin; 3.65% of mission evangelicals; 1.25% are evangelicals with no institutional link; and 0.65% belong to other evangelical religions.

There are also Christians of other denominations, such as Jehovah's Witnesses (who represent 0.86% of the inhabitants) and the Church of Jesus Christ of Latter-day Saints (0.20%).

==== Spiritism ====
According to IBGE, in 2000 11.00% of the population were spiritists.

Vinhedo has six centers of spiritualism, which includes the Spiritist Center "Paulo de Tarsus", House of Prayer "Path of Flowers and Light", Spiritist Center "Allan Kardec", Spiritist Center "Batuíra de Vinhedo", Fraternity "Luís Sérgio", Spiritist Group "Love and Light".

== Culture ==
The responsible for the cultural sector of Vinhedo is the Municipal Secretary of Culture, which aims to plan and implement the cultural policy of the municipality through the development of programs, projects and activities aimed at cultural development. The city is one of the cultural centers in the State of São Paulo. Vineyard has a theater house, cultural centers, coral groups, municipal library, art galleries, museum, among others.

Vinhedo shares with neighbor Itupeva the Vida Completa SerrAzul complex located next to the Bandeirantes Highway. The complex includes the amusement park Hopi Hari, the water park Wet 'n Wild, two shopping centers, a hotel and a convention center.

=== Grape Festival ===
The event began even before the emancipation of the municipality, around 1948, when the farmers gathered to celebrate the harvest of the fruits to the sound of music and much joy. It was a magical moment, when the producers celebrated with the local community the fruit of their work.

Officially, the first Grape Festival took place in Piazza Sant'Anna in 1948. With the advancement of the times and also as the city prospered, the Grape Festival - as it could not fail to be - increased its proportions. In 2009 the Grape Festival added the Wine Festival, which was incorporated into the calendar of events to also enhance the cultivation and production of juice and wine from the Vinhedo families.

At present, the festivities take place in Jayme Ferragut Municipal Park and receive thousands of people, both locals and tourists. Attractions include exhibition and sale of fruits, award-winning fruit auction, various handicrafts, amusement park, great concerts with nationally renowned artists, dance performances, regional bands in various musical styles, varied performances, food court, parade of riders, ride of motorcyclists.

The events also annually elect their promoters. Women from the age of 18 to 35, who dream of representing Vinhedo during these two festivities, the most traditional of the city, can apply for the function.

== Education ==
Portuguese is the official national language and therefore the main language taught in schools. But English and Spanish are part of the official high school curriculum.

Vinhedo has about 12,740 children up to 14 years old, about 20% of its population, and faces shortage of places in kindergartens and public schools for this age group.

In 2015, the students of the initial years of the city's public network had an average grade of 6.6 in the IDEB. For students in the final years, this grade was 5.2. In the comparison with cities of the same state, the grade of the pupils of the initial years ranked city 127th out of 645. Considering the grade of the students of the final years, the rank is 123rd of 645. The rate of schooling (for 6 to 14 years) was 97.5 in 2010. This ranked the municipality 446th of 645 among the cities of the state and 2904th of 5570 among the cities of Brazil.

=== Child Education Centers (CECs) ===
- CEC. Branca de Neve
- CEC. Chapeuzinho Vermelho
- CEC. Cuca
- CEC. Emília
- CEC. Grilo Falante
- CEC. Mágico de Oz
- CEC. Marquês de Rabicó
- CEC. Monteiro Lobato
- CEC. Narizinho
- CEC. Pequeno Príncipe (Complexo Educacional Norberto Elias)
- CEC. Pequeno Polegar
- CEC. Peter Pan
- CEC. Saci-Pererê
- CEC. Sítio do Pica-Pau Amarelo
- CEC. Tia Anastácia
- CEC. Tio Barnabé
- CEC. Turma da Mônica
- CEC. Vila Sésamo
- CEC. Visconde de Sabugosa
- CEC. Pedrinho

(Source: City Hall Vinhedo)

=== Municipal Schools (MS) ===
From 1st to 9th year of elementary school

- MS. Abel Maria Torres
- MS. Centro Integrado de Cidadania (CIC) Eduardo Von Zuben
- MS. Dom Mathias
- MS. Dr. Abrahão Aun
- MS. Jair Mendes de Barros
- MS. Dra. Nilza Maria Carbonari Ferragut (Complexo Educacional Norberto Elias)
- MS. Integração
- MS. Professora Antônia do Canto e Silva Cordeiro
- MS. Professora Darci Ana Dêgelo
- MS. Professora Maria de Lourdes Von Zuben
- MS. Professora Magdalena Lébeis
- MS. Professor André Franco Montoro
- MS. Professor Cláudio Gomes
- MS. Professor Ricardo Junco Neto

(Source: City Hall Vinhedo)

=== State Schools (SS) ===
Although they are not part of the Municipal Education Network and are directly linked to the state government, the schools mentioned below are located in the municipality.

- SS. Israel Schoba
- SS. Profª Maria do Carmo Ricci Von Zuben
- SS. Patriarca da Independência

(Source: City Hall Vinhedo)

== Media ==
In telecommunications, the city was served by Telecomunicações de São Paulo. In July 1998, this company was acquired by Telefónica, which adopted the Vivo brand in 2012. The company is currently an operator of cell phones, fixed lines, internet (fiber optics/4G) and television (satellite and cable).

== Sports ==
Vinhedo houses football clubs known regionally, which are largely shipowners' teams. It is present in the county clubs of volleyball, rugby among others. The Municipality of Vinhedo together with the Government of the State of São Paulo has been investing so that the whole population has access to the sport, thus offering gyms in the open air. This investment has attracted more investments to the municipality and thus arousing the interest of the residents with the practice of the sport.

== Government ==
The municipal administration is given by the executive and legislative branches. Executive power is exercised by the mayor, aided by his cabinet of secretaries, and elected by direct vote for a four-year term. Vinhedo had as first mayor Abrahão Aun, who remained in the position between 1949 and 1953. The current mayor is Jaime César da Cruz, deputy mayor who was sworn in after the removal of former President Milton Álvaro Serafim and elected in the first round of the 2016 elections, with Claudineia Vendemiatti Serafim, both of the Partido da Social Democracia Brasileira (PSDB). The legislative power is represented by the municipal council, made up of 16 councilors.

== See also ==
- List of municipalities in São Paulo
- Interior of São Paulo
