= Betel (district of Paulínia) =

Human settlement in Brazil

Coordinates: 22°47′15.91″S 47°06′42.87″W

Betel is a district of Paulínia, located 5 km to the East of Paulínia downtown, bordering the Campinas district of Barão Geraldo. Its area is about 49.5 km^{2} and it had a population of 6,242 at the time of the 2010 IBGE census. In 1993, the region was part of the district of Barão Geraldo in Campinas. That year, a referendum concerning its accession to Paulínia was held, as Betel was economically very attached to the city; the population voted to join the Paulínia municipality, which subsequently expanded in area.

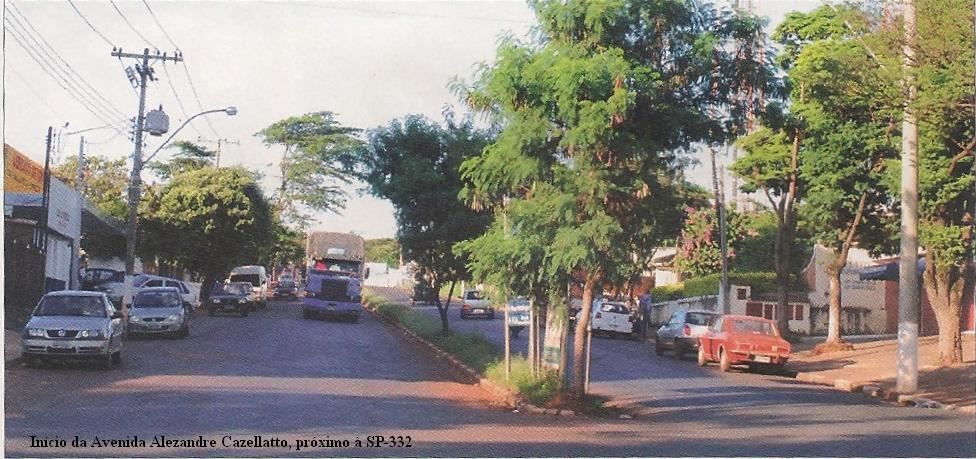
View of the entrance of Betel, near the SP-332

== History ==
The region of Betel began to be populated around the year 1889, when the Funilense Railroad was built. The railroad was a milestone for the settlement of Barão Geraldo and Betel. Betel was then a part of Barão Geraldo. In 1950 the Alvorada Parque neighborhood was founded, slowly expanding towards the region of the Constant Pavan Avenue. As Betel grew, it approached the city of Paulínia. In 1993, a plebiscite was held on the accession of Betel to Paulínia; 73.5% of 441 registered voters voted in favor of it, and Betel became a district of Paulínia.

== Neighborhoods of Betel ==
By 1993 Betel included two neighborhoods: Alvorada Parque and Okinawa. After that year, due to the intense urban growth, new neighborhoods appeared in the district. Currently there are 18 neighborhoods in Betel, condominiums and urban centers:

- Boa Esperança
- Business Center
- Centro Empresarial nossa Senhora de Fátima
- Condomínio Santa Izabel
- Fazenda do Deserto
- Greenville
- Jardim Ivone Alegre
- Morro Azul
- Moradas de Betel
- Okinawa
- Parque das Indústrias
- Polo de Ensino Profissional
- Porto do Sol
- Residencial das Paineiras
- Residencial Manacás
- Sítio Bonomi
- Unicamp (CPQBA)
- Vila Alvorada Parque

The population is concentrated in the Alvorada Parque and the Parque das Indústrias, which is located in the main shopping district.

== Urban Organization ==
In Betel there are three main avenues:

- Alexandre Cazellatto Avenue, that connects the neighborhood Alvorada Parque to neighborhoods Parque das Indústrias and the Residencial Paineiras, near the Rodovia Doutor Roberto Moreira or PLN 010.
- Constant Pavan Avenue, connecting the neighborhood Alvorada Parque to neighborhood Business Center and Nossa Senhora de Fátima, in PLN 010.
- Professor Benedito Montenegro Avenue, connecting the avenues Alexandre Cazellatto and Constant Pavan and the region of Irene Karcher Avenue, the main core of industrialization of Betel.

Besides the above avenues, there are a number of secondary roads, which are:

- Avenida Armando Botasso Street
- Avenida Irene Karcher Avenue
- Avenida Maria Estéfano Maluf Avenue
- Avenida 1 – Business Center
- Avenida 2 – Parque das Indústrias
- Estrada do Morro Azul
- PLN 393
- PLN 464

== Educational Center ==
Betel is located in a center of vocational schools as composed of the ETEP, the SENAI, the CEFUP-Training Center of Public officials Paulínia as well as School Professor Domingos de Araújo, among others.

PLN 393 is located in the CPQBA (Center Multidisciplinary Research Chemical, Biological and Agricultural) of Unicamp, which conducts scientific and technological research.

== Economy ==
Betel is a major industrial center, being the second largest of Paulínia after the Replan region. Companies like Heringer, Galvani, Rhodia and Purina maintain industrial operations in Betel, which have seen increased pollution levels and subsequent environmental problems.
