= Rodovia Professor Zeferino Vaz =

Highway in São Paulo, Brazil

SP-332
- Rodovia Professor Zeferino Vaz; Rodovia General Milton Tavares de Souza; Rodovia Campinas-Paulínia; Tapetão
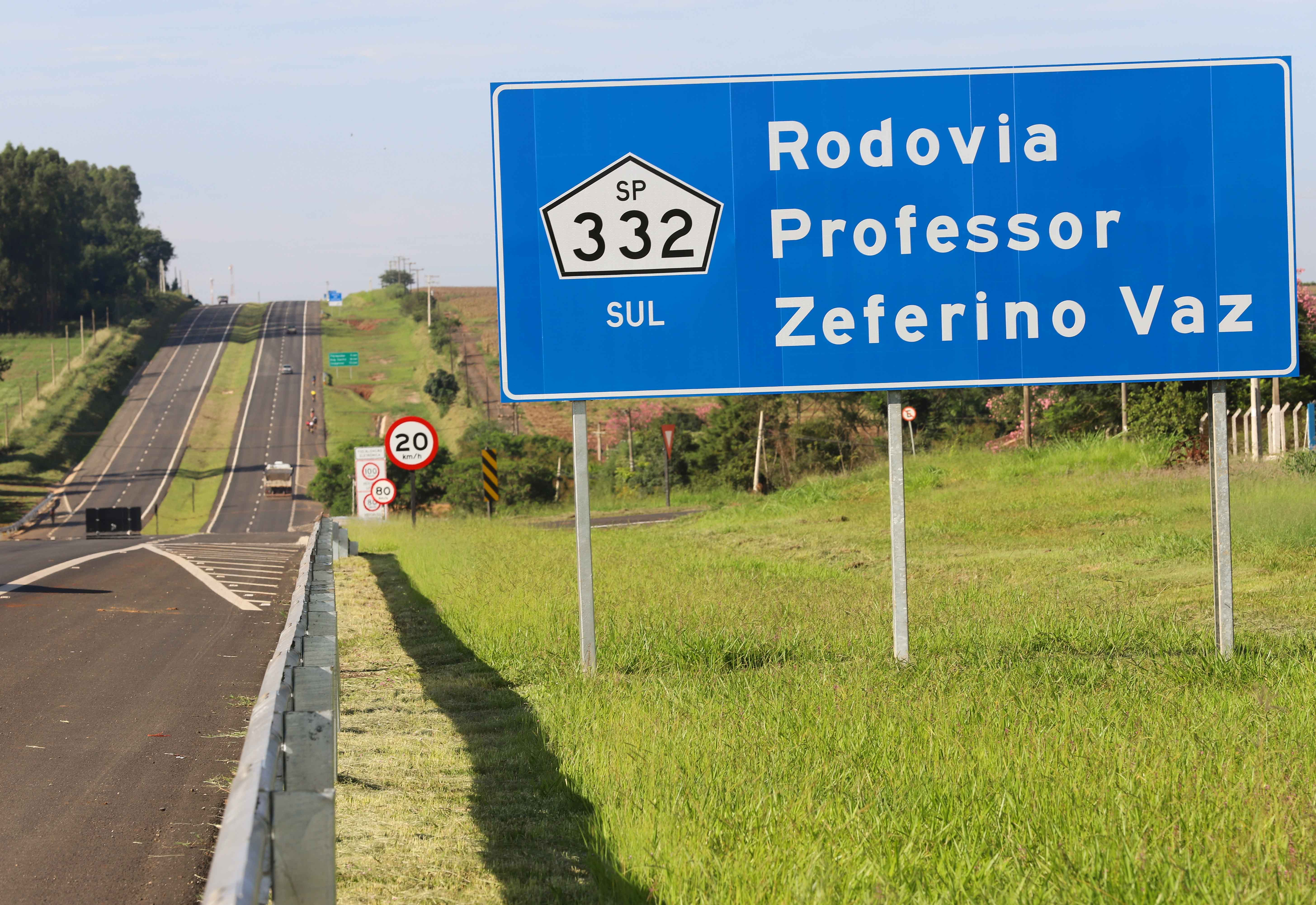
- The highway's identification sign in Conchal

Route information
- Maintained by the Department of Roads of the State of São Paulo (DER) and Rota das Bandeiras
- Length: 81 km (50 mi)
- Existed: July 14, 1981–present

Major junctions
- North end: Rua Júlio Fernandes in Mogi Guaçu, SP
- SP-065; PLN 010 (Rodovia Doutor Roberto Moreira); SP-191
- South end: Rua Carolina Florence in Campinas, SP

Location
- Country: Brazil
- State: São Paulo

Highway system
- Highways in Brazil; Federal; São Paulo State Highways

Rodovia Professor Zeferino Vaz (official designation SP-332, also known as Rodovia Campinas-Paulínia or Tapetão) is a highway in the state of São Paulo, Brazil. Until 2010, this highway was called Rodovia General Milton Tavares de Souza, after Milton Tavares de Souza. Its current namesake is professor Zeferino Vaz.

Just 23 km long, this double-lane highway has a high traffic within the urban zones of Campinas and Paulínia. It has been named in honour of teacher Zeferino Vaz and is maintained by the Department of Roads of the State of São Paulo (DER) and Rota das Bandeiras. It is best known as the road that connects the city of Campinas to the subdistrict of Barão Geraldo, where the State University of Campinas is located, as well as to the oil refinery of Petrobras and the adjoining industrial petrochemistry district of Paulínia.

== Cities ==
- Campinas
  - Barão Geraldo
- Paulínia
  - Betel
- Cosmópolis
- Artur Nogueira
- Engenheiro Coelho
- Conchal

== See also ==
- Highway system of São Paulo
- Brazilian Highway System
