= Paulínia =

Municipality in the state of São Paulo in Brazil

- Municipality
- Municipality of Paulínia
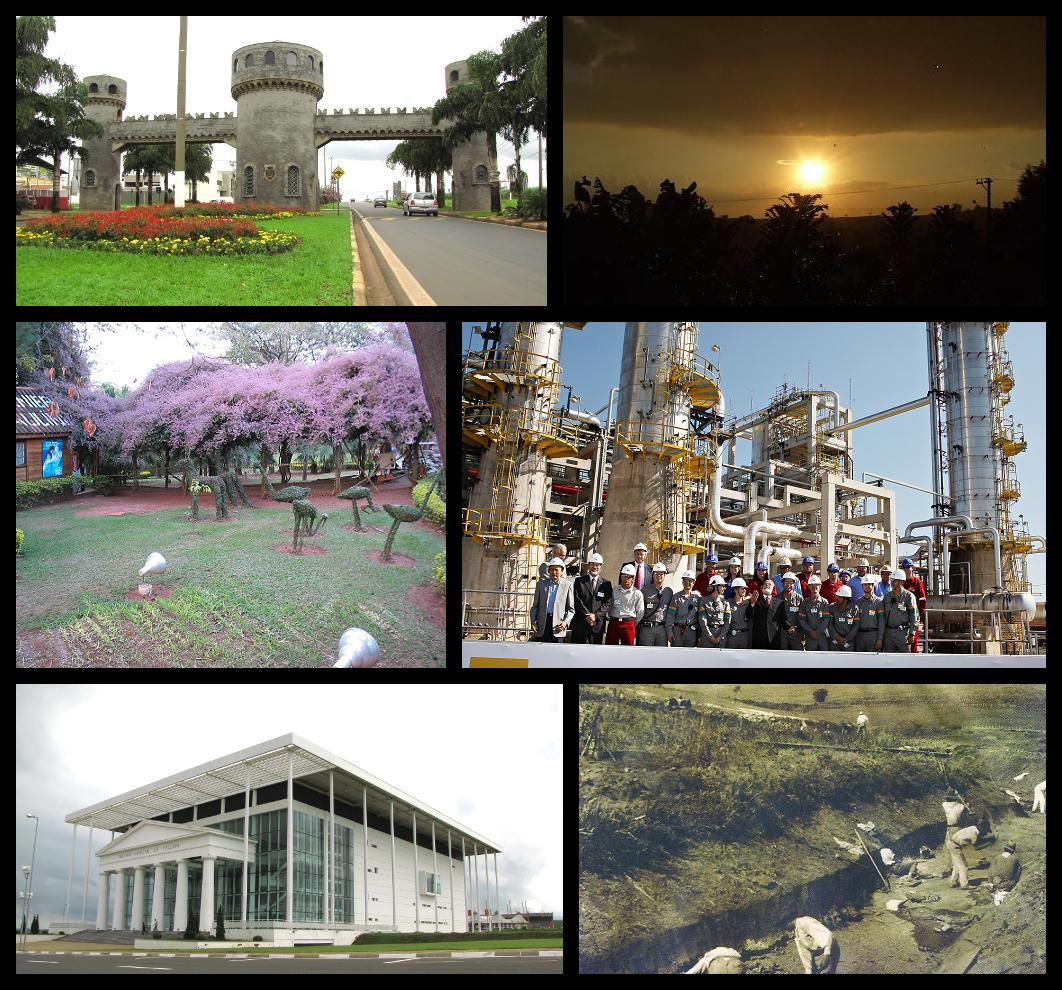
- Images of the city of Paulínia: above, left, Medieval Gate; above, right, sunset near rural areas on the border with Cosmópolis; center, left, animals from the ecological park; center, right, Replan employees meeting former president Lula; below, left, the Municipal Theater; and below, right, historical image of workers opening the way for the railroad.

- Flag Coat of arms

- Location of Paulinia in São Paulo

- Location of Paulinia in Brazil
- Coordinates: 22°45′40″S 47°09′15″W
- Country: Brazil
- Region: Southeast
- State: São Paulo
- Macrometropolis: São Paulo
- Founded: 16 July 1906

Government
  - Mayor: Danilo H. Barros

Area
  - Total: 138.78 km^{2} (53.58 sq mi)
- Elevation: 590 m (1,940 ft)

Population (2022 Census)
  - Total: 110,537
  - Estimate (2025): 116,674
  - Density: 796.49/km^{2} (2,062.9/sq mi)
- Demonym: paulinense
- Time zone: UTC−3 (BRT)
- Postal Code: 13140-001 to 13149-999
- Area code: +55 19
- Website: www.paulinia.sp.gov.br

Paulínia is a Brazilian municipality in the interior of the state of São Paulo. It is located in the northwest of the São Paulo Macrometropolis and is about 119 km from the state capital. It occupies an area of 139 km^{2} and in 2022 Census, IBGE estimated its population at 110,537. It was emancipated on 28 February 1964, but its foundation dates back to the beginning of the 20th century. The town is named after José Paulino Nogueira, a well-known farmer in the Campinas region, the municipality from which Paulínia emancipated and who lent his name to the railroad station around which the town developed. It is located in the Rio-São Paulo axis, serving as a link between Greater São Paulo and cities in the area, such as Cosmópolis, Artur Nogueira, and Conchal.

It is known for hosting one of the largest petrochemical poles in Latin America, centered on the Paulínia Refinery (Replan). Thanks to Replan and the petrochemical pole, which are based in the northern part of the city, Paulínia has the seventh highest per capita income in Brazil. Also due to the pole, the city presents high levels of ozone pollution, mainly in the district of Betel and in the Replan region, where companies such as Rhodia, Purina, Shell, Syngenta, and Petrobras are located. Paulínia stands out for its intense population growth, the largest in the Metropolitan Region of Campinas. Historically, the service sector has not been very important for the municipality, but recently it has been developing because of projects like Paulínia Magia do Cinema (English: Paulínia Magic of Cinema).

Since 2019, Paulínia has had a new source of income and employment for the city and the Metropolitan Region of Campinas. The technology sector has been growing in Paulínia with the arrival of ASCENTY, a multinational company specialized in the field of "Data Centers", with data processing centers and branches in Brazil, Chile, Mexico and Colombia, thus opening the door for the arrival of two other companies in the city, CloudHQ and Amazon.

The municipality is formed by the city of Paulínia and the district of Betel, in the eastern region. Paulínia is part of the so-called Extended Metropolitan Complex, which exceeds 29 million inhabitants, approximately 75% of the population of the entire state of São Paulo. The metropolitan regions of Campinas and São Paulo already form the first megalopolis in the southern hemisphere, uniting 65 municipalities that together are home to 12% of the Brazilian population.

== Etymology ==
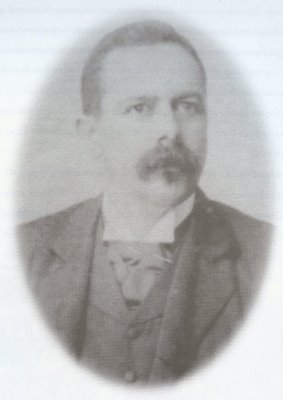
José Paulino Nogueira, from whom the name Paulínia derived.

The term Paulínia pays homage to José Paulino Nogueira, a farmer from Campineiro, one of the owners of Funil farm, located between the present-day cities of Paulínia and Cosmópolis. The village that gave rise to the city of Paulínia was called José Paulino Village until 1944, when a state decree prohibited localities from having names of living people. Due to this fact, the village was elevated to a district with the name "Paulínia".

José Paulino was born on 13 February 1853, in Campinas. At the end of the Empire, as a member of the Republican Party of São Paulo, he was elected an alderman in his hometown, alongside Júlio de Mesquita and Salvador Penteado. In March 1889, when there was an outbreak of yellow fever in Campinas, José Paulino was one of the few authorities who did not abandon the city; he fought the disease and became loved by the people of Campinas. At the end of the 19th century, Paulino and his brothers started to clear the way for Funil farm, between Paulínia and Cosmópolis. With the construction of the Funilense Railroad, a railroad station was also built in the São Bento neighborhood, which became known as José Paulino. The small neighborhood of São Bento grew up around the station and also became known as José Paulino. Due to the decree that prohibited names of living people in localities, upon its elevation to district José Paulino was renamed Paulínia.

== History ==
Paulínia's history begins long before its emancipation, which occurred in 1964; it goes back to the beginning of the 16th century, with the beginning of the occupation of the Campinas region.

=== Origins ===
During the 18th century, the region of Campinas began to be occupied due to the passage of the bandeirantes routes that headed for the gold mines in the interior of Brazil. The settlement began more precisely in the period between 1739 and 1744, when Captain Francisco Barreto Leme do Prado arrived at the then parish of Nossa Senhora de Conceição de Campinas.

The history of Paulínia as an urban agglomeration begins with the donation of sesmarias by the Portuguese government. There are reports of the donation of two large sesmarias in the region of the Atibaia and Jaguari rivers, where the city of Paulínia is located today, one in 1796 and another, called the Morro Azul sesmaria, in 1807. From the latter originated the São Bento farm, acquired by Comendador Francisco de Paula Camargo, and the Funil farm; both have a great connection with the establishment of Paulínia. Officially Paulínia was founded on 16 July 1906, by José Seixas de Queiroz; however, the city's anniversary is celebrated on the date the municipality was created, 28 February.

Paulínia's population was formed mainly by Italian immigrants, who replaced the slaves that worked on the farms after the abolition of slavery in 1888. However, with the economic growth, the city has become a destination for many immigrants from neighboring cities and other parts of Brazil, especially from the Northeast, who are looking for work or better living conditions.

=== From village to district ===
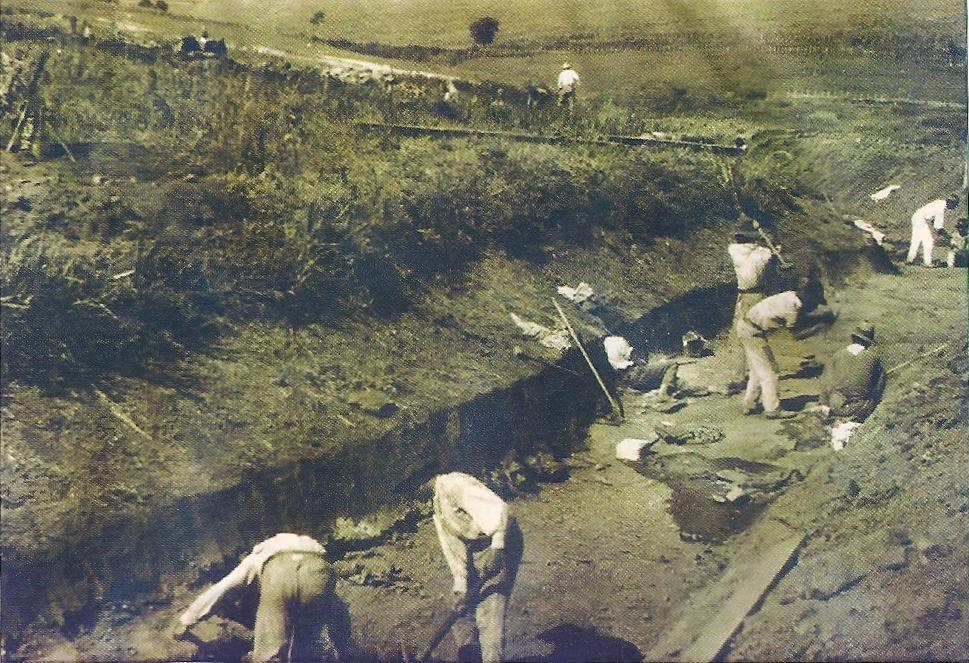
Workers from the surrounding farms cleared the way for the railroad.

The first urban center in the region of Paulínia was a village called São Bento where, in 1903, a chapel was inaugurated in honor of the same saint, which had begun to be built in 1897, the same year in which the plans and budget for the José Paulino station were approved. Around this chapel the São Bento neighborhood began to develop. At this time São Bento was a suburb of Campinas.

Due to the expansion of the agricultural culture, the farmers of the region started to feel difficulties in draining their production due to the presence of the Atibaia and Jaguari rivers, which made it difficult for them to cross with the products. In this context, the producers started to demand from the captaincy of São Paulo the construction of a railroad that would make it possible to transport their production to other centers. In 1880 credits were approved for the construction of the Companhia Carril Agrícola Funilense, connecting the city of Campinas to the region of Funil farm.

The inauguration of the carriage section of the Funilense Railroad, on 18 September 1899, changed the economic order of the São Bento neighborhood. The José Paulino Station attracted many merchants to the neighborhood and gave rise to José Paulino Village, the result of the development of the São Bento neighborhood. Around the station there was Comércio Street, later renamed José Paulino Avenue, and a replica of the chapel of the São Bento farm, the São Bento Church, which still exists today. On 30 November 1944, through Decree-Law 14334, José Paulino was elevated to a district with the name Paulínia.

=== From district to municipality ===
Paulínia remained a district of Campinas for twenty years. During this period the agricultural and industrial development reached the whole region, mainly with the installation of Rhodia in São Francisco farm in 1942. This fact represented an increase in tax collection for Campinas. In the mid-1950s, a retired employee from the Legislative Assembly of São Paulo, José Lozano Araújo, founded the Friends of Paulínia association and started a movement for the emancipation of Paulínia. The movement culminated with the holding of a plebiscite on 6 November 1963, which determined emancipation. On 28 February 1964, Law 8092 was published, creating the town of Paulínia.

The first elections took place on 7 March 1965, and José Lozano Araújo was elected. He was responsible for major works in the city and for the installation of Replan on the site, as he donated the land and exempted it from taxes for twenty years. The refinery transformed Paulínia into a population attraction center, growing from 6,900 inhabitants in 1972 to 28,620 in 1973, tripling the number of inhabitants.

=== Economic Growth ===
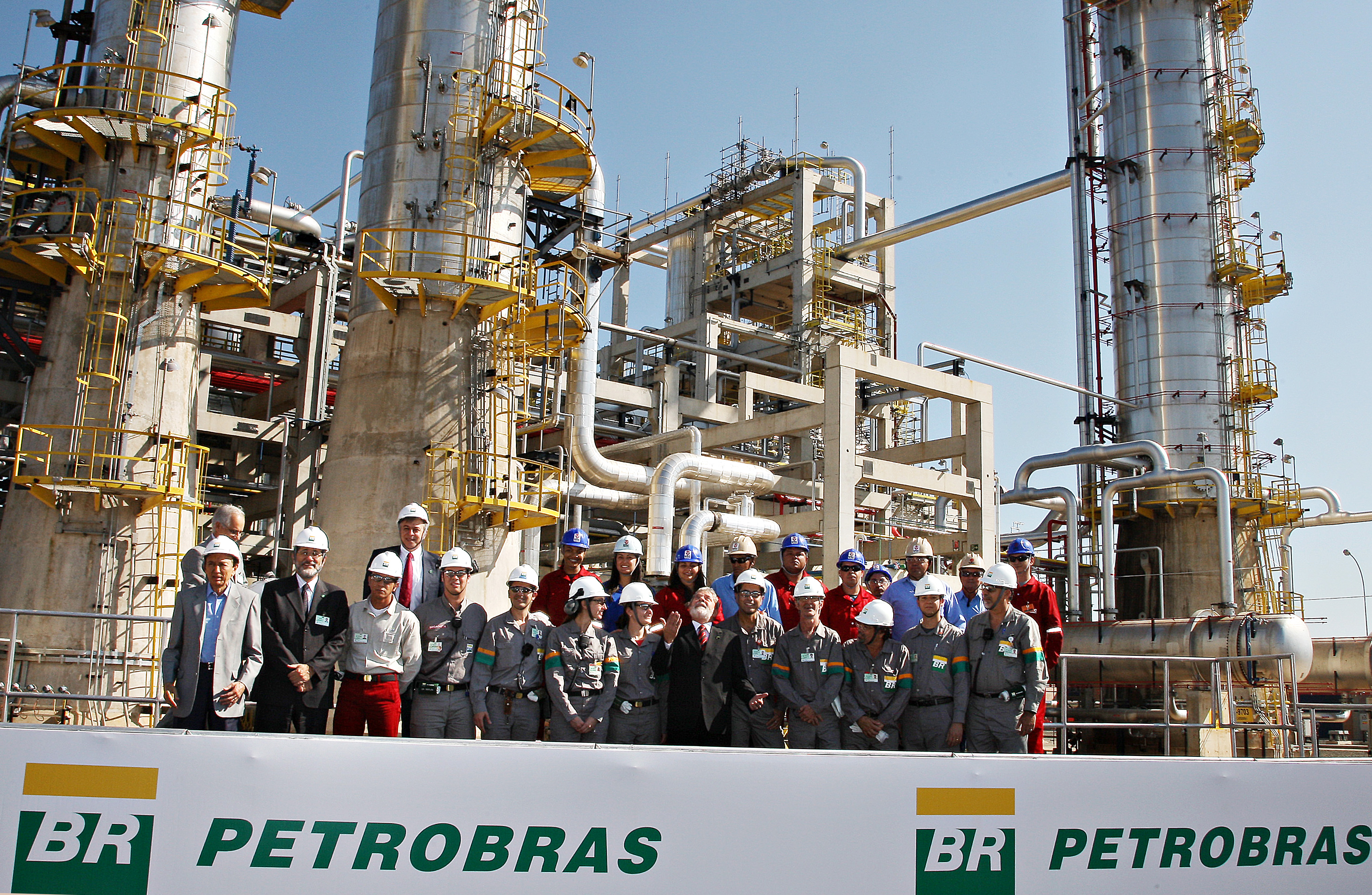
President Luiz Inácio Lula da Silva with workers at the inauguration of REPLAN's Propene Unit, in 2009.

The first industrial unit to be installed where Paulínia is today was Rhodia, in 1942. For years it was the main industry in the city, initially focused on agro-industrial production and later transformed into a chemical industry. In 1968, General Arthur Duarte Candal Fonseca, president of Petrobras, announced the construction of an oil refinery in Paulínia. Construction began on 28 February 1969, on the five-year anniversary of emancipation, and the refinery was inaugurated on 12 May 1972. The president of Brazil, General Emílio Garrastazu Médici, the president of Petrobras, Ernesto Geisel, and the head of the military cabinet of the presidency, General João Batista de Oliveira Figueiredo were present at the ceremony.

Replan has attracted thousands of immigrants to Paulínia, as well as other companies, which have transformed the town into the largest petrochemical complex in Latin America. Industries in Paulínia are concentrated in two distinct points: the REPLAN region and the district of Betel, which are consequently the richest and most polluted areas in Paulínia.

In 2005, Braskem and Petrobras Química S.A. - Petroquisa - set up Petroquímica Paulínia S.A., a joint venture responsible for operating a polypropylene industrial unit in the Replan region. It started operating in 2008, with initial capacity to produce 300 thousand tons per year of polypropylene, and potential to reach 350 thousand tons per year.

In late 2010, LG announced that it would build an industrial plant in the city of Paulínia, on land donated by the city government, which would produce white goods such as refrigerators, stoves, microwave ovens, among others. Construction was scheduled to begin in March 2011, with completion in October of the same year. The factory would employ 4.000 employees, surpassing Petrobras and becoming Paulínia's largest employer. However, by October, the construction work had not begun, causing the councilors to question the city hall. The initial project foresaw a three-story building, more suitable to the irregularity of the terrain. However, LG's headquarters requested a change to a single floor, which would have required the company to spend R$30 million on earthmoving. LG then asked the city to exchange the donated land, which was refused because there was no other land with the same measurements. After this refusal, the company asked the city to pay for the earthmoving, which was also rejected, because Mayor José Pavan Júnior considered that the administration had already spent too much on the project (the donated land was valued at at least R$100 million). Since then the contacts between the company and the city hall have decreased. The donated area will return to the city hall if construction does not begin by the end of 2015.

=== Recent History ===
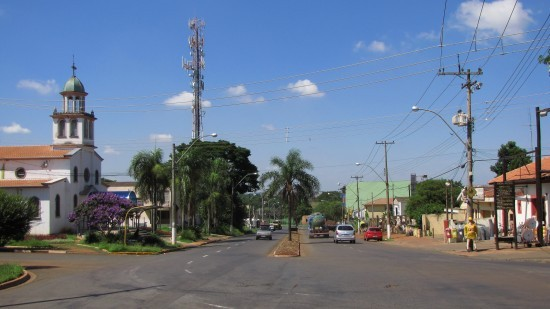
Central Betel region, annexed in 1993.

Paulínia's recent history is marked by great economic development, urban and population growth. Since the 1980s, when the municipal hospital was inaugurated, many works have been carried out to increase the capacity of some services. In 1981, the mayor of Paulínia at the time, Geraldo José Ballone, sent a law bill to the city council that created the municipal hospital. At the time the city had about 20,753 inhabitants, but the population did not have a public health facility in town that could provide examinations and consultations.

In the 1990s, great works were carried out in Paulínia, among them the construction of a virtual library, where citizens have free access to the internet, Paulínia's sambodrome, which is the largest indoor sambodrome in the country, and the improvement of the city's road systems.

The intense urban growth of Paulínia and neighboring cities provoked the conurbation effect. This phenomenon is stronger on the border of Paulínia with Sumaré, between the districts of Bom Retiro (Paulínia) and Maria Antônia (Sumaré), and on the border with Campinas, between the districts of Betel and Barão Geraldo. Paulínia has relevant territorial growth. In 1993 it annexed the Betel district, in Campinas, through a plebiscite. Neighborhoods and regions such as Granja Coavi, Parque dos Jequitibás and parts of the neighborhoods São José, João Aranha and Marieta Dian, which are in Cosmópolis and Americana also tend to be annexed by Paulínia.

== Geography ==
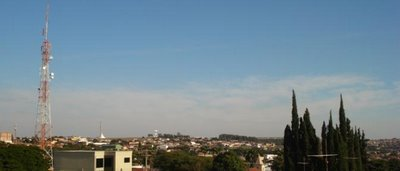
Panoramic view of Paulínia.

Paulínia's geography is homogeneous. The municipality has a flat relief and Atlantic vegetation. The area of the municipality is 141.72 km^{2}, representing 0.0509% of the São Paulo territory, 0.0353% of the area of the Southeast region of Brazil, and 0.0017% of the whole Brazilian territory. It is located in the central-eastern region of the state of São Paulo, between the Atibaia and Jaguari rivers and the Quilombo and Anhumas creeks, 118 kilometers from São Paulo by asphalt road, and 98 kilometers as the crow flies. Located in the Peripheral Paulista Depression, in São Paulo, the city borders Cosmópolis (to the north), Campinas (to the southeast), Sumaré (to the south), Nova Odessa (to the southwest), Jaguariúna (to the east), Holambra (to the northeast) and Americana (to the west). The urban perimeter of Paulínia is 137.61 km^{2}, which is equivalent to 99% of the total area.

Paulínia is located in the central area of the Metropolitan Region of Campinas, not bordering municipalities outside the region. Paulínia is geographically divided into two main regions, the north, where REPLAN and the district of São José are located, and the south, where Paulínia Shopping and the Paulínia Municipal Theater are, where the I Paulínia Film Festival was held; these two regions are divided by the Atibaia river. Paulínia's position was a problem for the old farms located in this area, which saw the rivers as "natural barriers to development" in the region.

=== Relief and geology ===
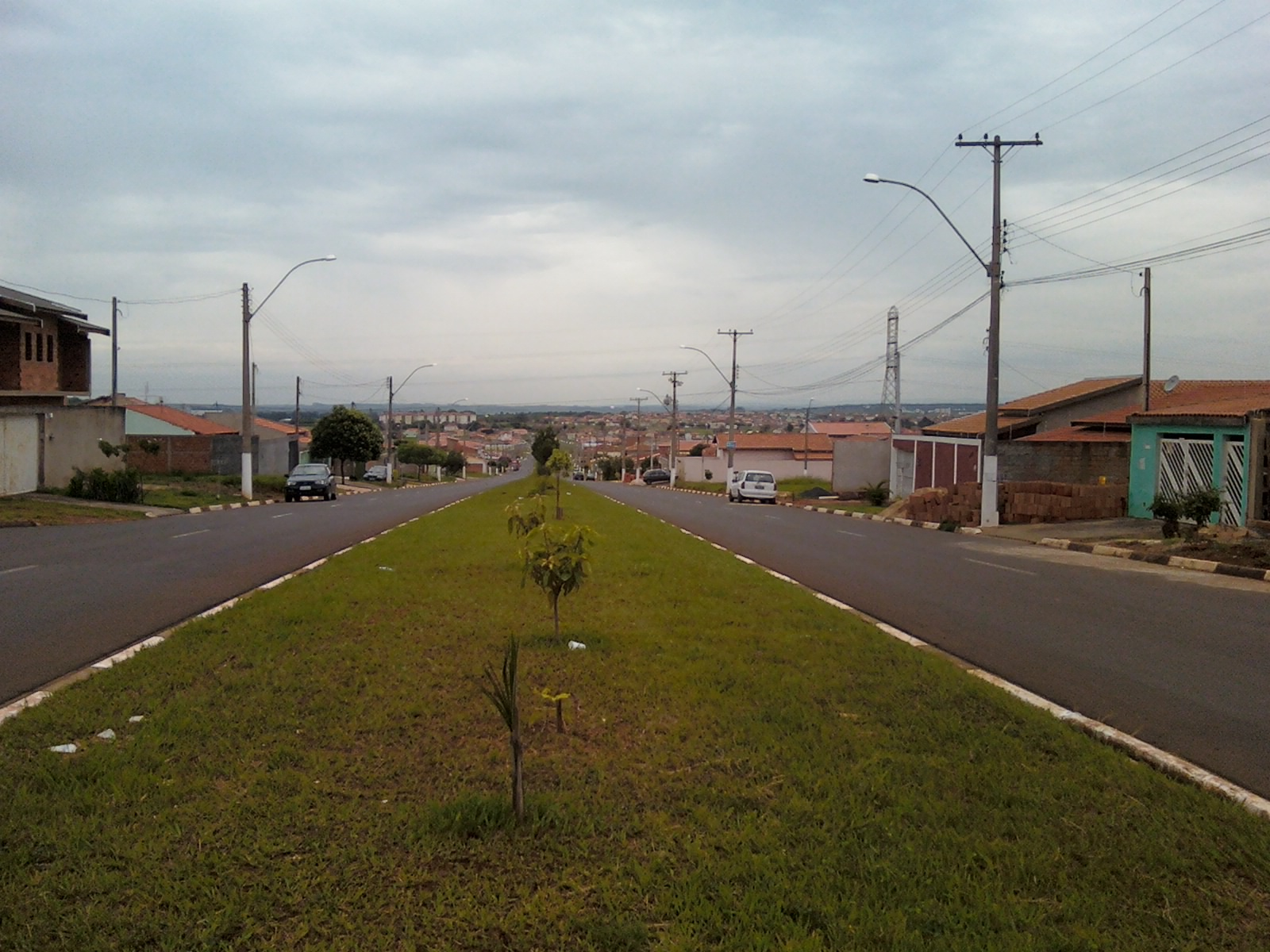
View of the Marieta Dian neighborhood, one of the city's high points.

Paulínia is located in the so-called Peripheral Paulista Depression, a formation between the western and Atlantic plateaus (Serra do Mar and Serra da Mantiqueira). The territory is homogeneous, with great relief variations only in the neighborhoods of Alto de Pinheiros, Vila Nunes, Marieta Dian, Santa Cecília and Tereza Zorzetto Vedovello. The highest neighborhoods in Paulínia are located in the northern and eastern regions of the city, such as Marieta Dian, São José and Parque das Indústrias.

Paulínia's soil is also homogeneous, being of good quality in most of the city. It is characteristic for having a lot of humus, which facilitates the development of crops.

The lowest altitudes of the Paulista Peripheral Depression are located in the region of the Atibaia and Jaguari rivers, between 560 and 600 meters above sea level. In this region the morphology is characterized by broad hills with flattened tops. This zone also has its greatest thicknesses, with the presence of fluvial facies typical of floodplains. Near Paulínia, they reach a thickness of about 10 meters. The diabase rocks are abundant between Paulínia and Campinas, and are fine to medium grained.

=== Hydrography ===
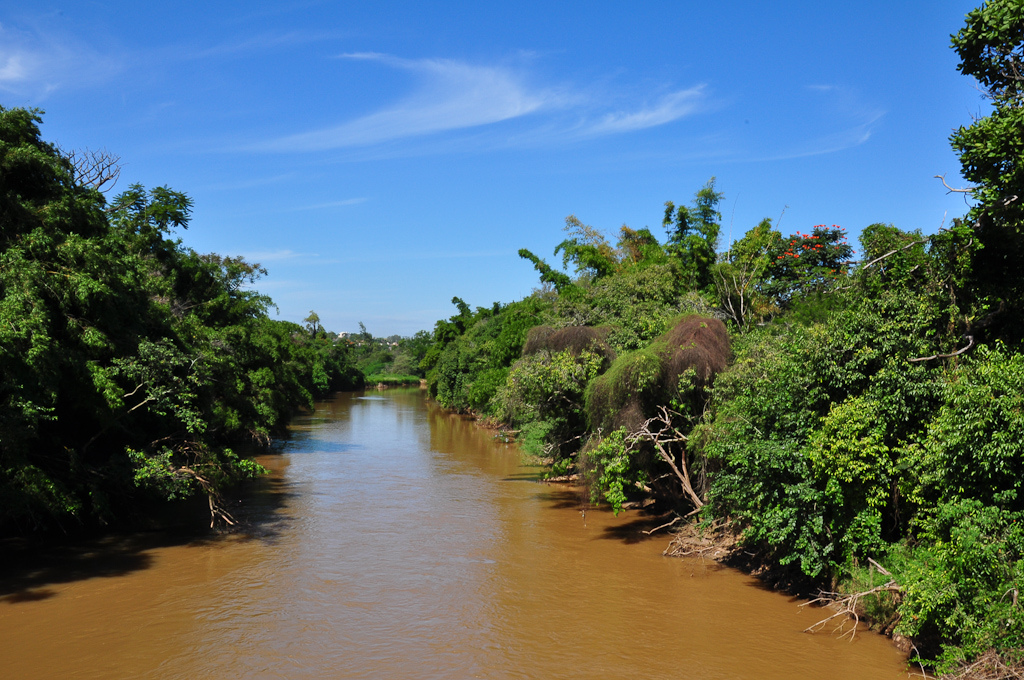
Stretch of the Atibaia River in Paulínia.

Two rivers pass through the city of Paulínia: the Jaguari river, which is located on the border of Paulínia and Cosmópolis, and the Atibaia river, which divides the city into two parts and passes near the center. Its origin is in Bom Jesus dos Perdões, the result of the junction of the Atibainha and Cachoeira rivers. In the municipality of Americana the river is dammed and the Salto Grande reservoir, as it is known, extends to the São Paulo neighborhoods of Parque da Represa and Balneário Tropical. The Jaguari river originates in Minas Gerais and receives important tributaries, such as the Camanducaia River. In the São Paulo territory the river is dammed as part of the cantareira system and in Americana it joins with the Atibaia river and forms the Piracicaba river.

Besides these rivers, several streams and creeks are present in Paulínia, especially the Quilombo creek, on the border with Sumaré, and the Anhumas creek, on the border with Campinas and Jaguariúna. Among the streams are Jacaré and Jacarezinho, which are tributaries of Jaguari, Areião, Veadinho, and São Bento, tributaries of the Atibaia River, and the streams Betel, Fazenda do Deserto and Velosa (the latter on the border with Sumaré), tributaries of Quilombo Creek. The municipality also has several lakes and lagoons, the main ones being Santa Terezinha, Armando Ferreira, Jardim Botânico, José Maria Malavazzi and César Bierrembach.

=== Climate ===
The city of Paulínia belongs to the climate zone designated by the letter C, with climate type Cwa, according to the Köppen-Geiger climate classification, and the climate is considered subhumid temperate, with rains concentrated in the summer months, with a decrease in its frequency in the winter, when the relative humidity of the air drops, especially during the afternoon, with rates below 30% or even close to 20%. Due to the low concentration of buildings, heat islands rarely occur, so the thermometers remain below the 40 °C mark in most of the city, even in the hottest months of the year.

According to data from the Integrated Center for Agrometeorological Information (CIIAGRO/SP), referring to the period from December 1993 to January 2011 and from February 2016, the absolute minimum temperature recorded in Paulinia was 0 °C in June 1994, on 26 and 27 June, and the highest reached 40.6 °C on 8 October 2020. The highest rainfall accumulations recorded in 24 hours, equal to or greater than 100 mm, were 119.4 mm on 1 December 2003, 118.6 mm on 17 November 2003, and 103.4 mm on 22 December 2020.

Climate data for Paulínia
Month	Jan	Feb	Mar	Apr	May	Jun	Jul	Aug	Sep	Oct	Nov	Dec	Year
Mean daily maximum °C (°F)	30.3 (86.5)	30.9 (87.6)	30.7 (87.3)	29.5 (85.1)	26.2 (79.2)	26.2 (79.2)	26.2 (79.2)	27.8 (82.0)	29 (84)	30.1 (86.2)	30.1 (86.2)	30.5 (86.9)	28.9 (84.0)
Mean daily minimum °C (°F)	19.8 (67.6)	19.7 (67.5)	19.1 (66.4)	17 (63)	13.7 (56.7)	12.2 (54.0)	11.9 (53.4)	12.8 (55.0)	15.4 (59.7)	17.5 (63.5)	18.1 (64.6)	19.3 (66.7)	16.4 (61.5)
Average precipitation mm (inches)	272.3 (10.72)	185.7 (7.31)	156.4 (6.16)	57.6 (2.27)	55.8 (2.20)	40.4 (1.59)	35.2 (1.39)	28.8 (1.13)	57.6 (2.27)	109.8 (4.32)	165.6 (6.52)	216 (8.5)	1,381.2 (54.38)
Source: Climate-data

=== Biodiversity and green areas ===
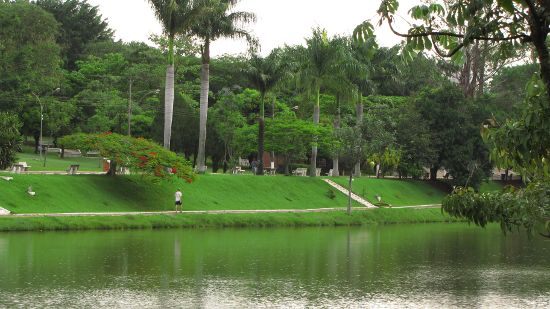
Zeca Malavazzi Park, a place with preserved vegetation.

Paulínia's fauna presents species typical of the Atlantic Forest and Cerrado, but in some places species from other domains can be found. In the minipantanal, which is an area of transition between biomes, species such as the spot-flanked gallinule, black skimmer, herons, and nutrias can be found. Capybaras are found almost everywhere along the Atibaia River, and are common in the Campinas region.

Paulínia is a municipality where a large part of the original landscape, originally covered by the Atlantic Forest, has been modified due to human action. Currently the few original green areas are protected so that they do not disappear. In order to do this, the city government has created the areas of environmental preservation under reclamation, to recover degraded areas. The main areas where the vegetation is intact or little altered are located in the neighborhoods of Cascata, Recanto dos Pássaros, Parque Brasil 500, Betel, Planalto and Monte Alegre. Other preserved areas are in rural or uninhabited areas, such as Jardim Harmonia, isolated regions of Betel, bordering areas and areas in the north of Paulínia.

Several environmental areas in Paulínia are important tourist attractions, such as the minipantanal and the botanical garden, which is one of the most respected in the state and in the country.

=== Environmental Problems ===
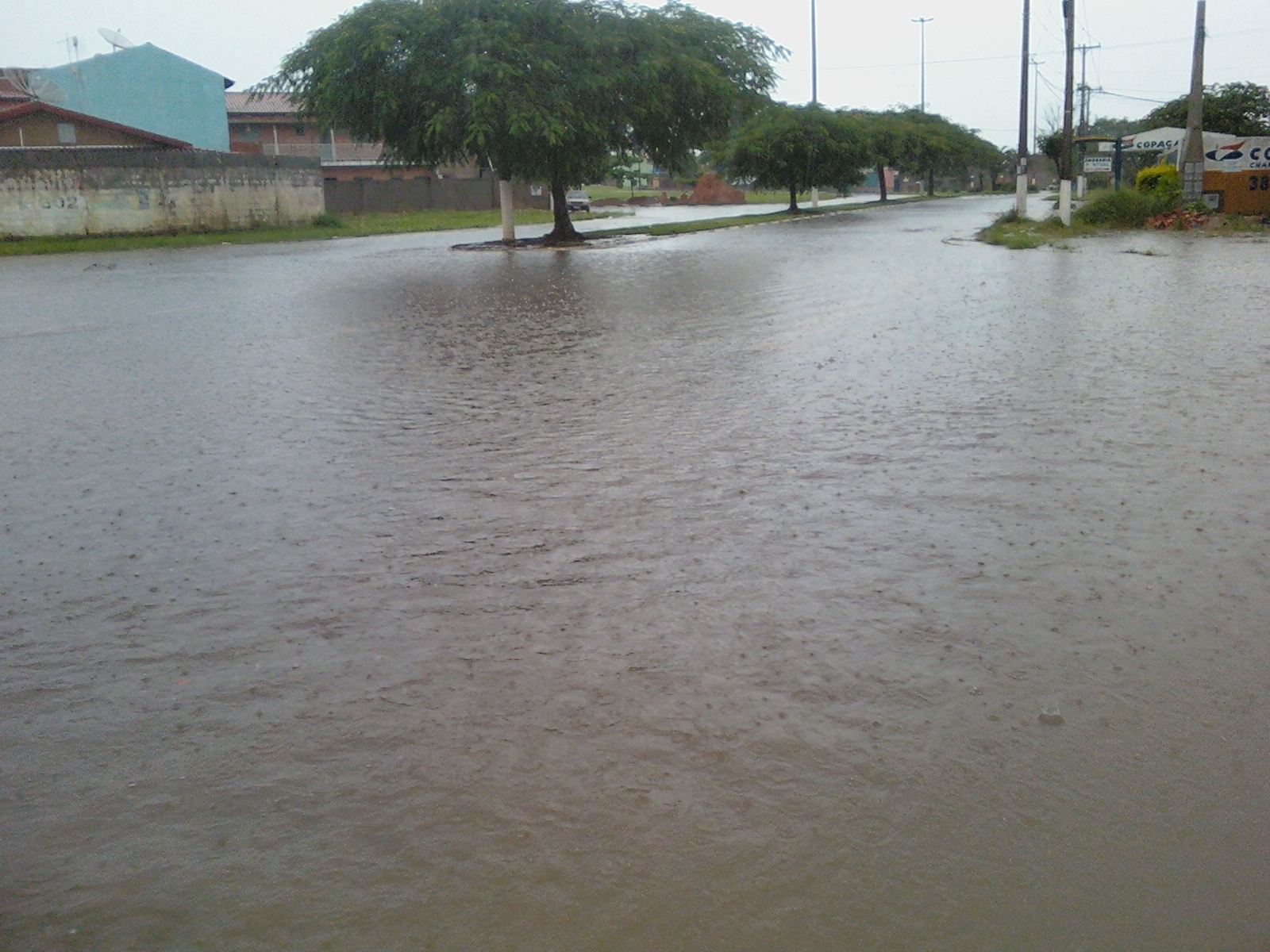
Flooding at Dorcelino R da Cunha Street, in the São José neighborhood.

Paulínia is environmentally stressed, which means that it has a vegetation cover of less than 5% of the municipal area, consequently presenting higher risks of flooding,aggradation of water courses, erosion, and disappearance of fauna and flora. In heavy rainfall events, several streets and avenues in Paulínia suffer from flooding. Among the regions where this problem is constant, the low-lying areas near the César Bierrembach lagoon in the neighborhoods São José and João Aranha, on José Paulino Avenue, in the Recanto dos Pássaros and Jardim Europa neighborhoods stand out. The problems occur mainly due to the lack of culverts and galleries for draining excess water, except in the case of Recanto dos Pássaros, which is affected by the flooding of the Atibaia river.

The city's air pollution by ozone is intense, mainly due to the large amount of polluting industries, such as REPLAN, but contrary to what is commonly said, the city has normal levels of other pollutants, such as the hourly average concentration of nitrogen dioxide (NO_{2}), which was 87.8 ppb (particles per billion) in 2002, while the acceptable level is 170 ppb.

The city also suffers from water pollution that affects some of the city's streams. The city's rivers, mainly the Atibaia river, are also affected by contamination with chemicals highly harmful to health, as in 1995, when it became public the contamination of the Atibaia river and the water table near the area by Shell, which due to flooding and the fact that many residents use wells, contaminated the population of the Recanto dos Pássaros neighborhood, who were forced to leave the place. Currently there is still a problem with the contamination caused by Shell, and efforts are being made to prevent a bigger problem from occurring.

Some streams in Paulínia, such as the Jacaré stream, are at risk of disappearing due to environmental damage in their sources. The Jacaré stream has its spring at the central border of José Bordignon Avenue, near a scrap metal warehouse, and its first stretches are full of garbage, which can gradually compromise the César Bierrembach lagoon, which depends largely on this stream. The Morro Alto stream, located in the neighborhood of the same name and a tributary of the Atibaia river, disappeared due to the subdivision of its source area, where the Parque das Árvores neighborhood was created.

== Demography ==
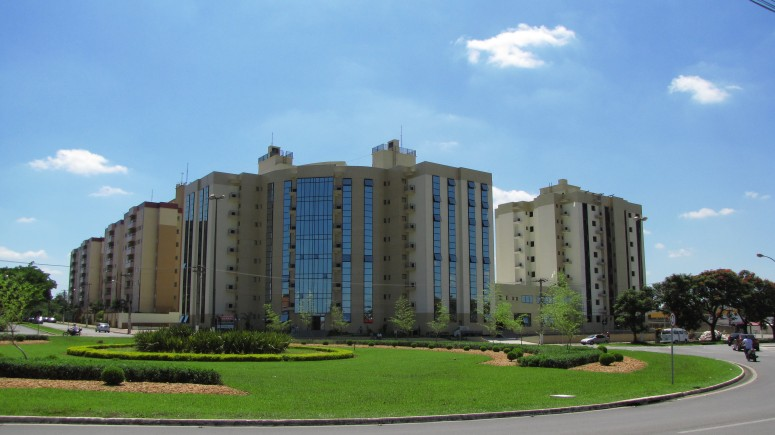
Residential and commercial buildings in the Morumbi neighborhood.

According to the IBGE, the municipality's population in 2010 was counted at 82,150 inhabitants, being the 87th most populous municipality in the state, with a population density of 368.46 inhabitants per km^{2}. According to the 2010 census, 49.51% of the population is male and 50.49% is female, and 99.91% of the population lives in the urban area and 0.09% lives in the rural area. According to the Atlas of Human Development in Brazil, the population of Paulínia is equivalent to 0.06% of the national population, and according to the IBGE, Paulínia had 50,566 voters in 2006. In the last few years, Paulínia has had a relevant population growth.

The Municipal Human Development Index (HDI-M) of Paulínia is considered high by the United Nations Development Programme (UNDP), with a value of 0.847. Considering only education, the index value is 0.924, while Brazil's is 0.849, the longevity index is 0.805 (Brazil's is 0.638), and the income index is 0.811 (Brazil's is 0.723). Paulínia has most of the high indicators according to the UNDP. The per capita income is 106,082.00 reais, the literacy rate is 93.93% and the life expectancy is 73.30 years. The Gini coefficient, which measures social inequality, is 0.39, where 1.00 is the worst number and 0.00 is the best. The incidence of poverty, measured by IBGE, is 14.76% and the incidence of subjective poverty is 10.93%. Paulínia has improved all its indicators in the last years, showing that the improvement in the quality of life has been increasing. The population of Paulinia is composed of 71% white, 22% brown, 5% black and 2% people of other ethnicities.

Two problems of the city are the housing deficit and the deficit of places in day care centers. The housing deficit in Paulínia is approximately ten thousand dwellings. The city administration is studying several projects to enable the construction of affordable housing and reduce this number, among them the construction of two subdivisions in the João Aranha and São Bento neighborhoods. Paulínia has no slums or illegal allotments, but has a large number of tenements and some invasions, the largest of which is located near the allotment Jardim Amélia Duarte Quintal, in the Saltinho neighborhood, whose families come from another invasion, called Granja Coavi, located in Cosmópolis. The growth of this invasion is already causing many people to consider it a slum beginning. There is also another invasion in the southern region of the city, in the Paraíso farm, which was occupied after the expropriation of the land by the city government, which to this day has not carried out works in the area. However, this invasion may disappear with the arrival of LG, which will install an industrial unit in part of the farm. The problem of lack of vacancies in day care centers is also serious, because despite having 27 units, there is still a deficit of 900 vacancies. Two day care centers were to be inaugurated in 2009, however, the construction of a unit in the Bom Retiro neighborhood was paralyzed and deprived the municipality of about 300 vacancies.

=== Religion ===
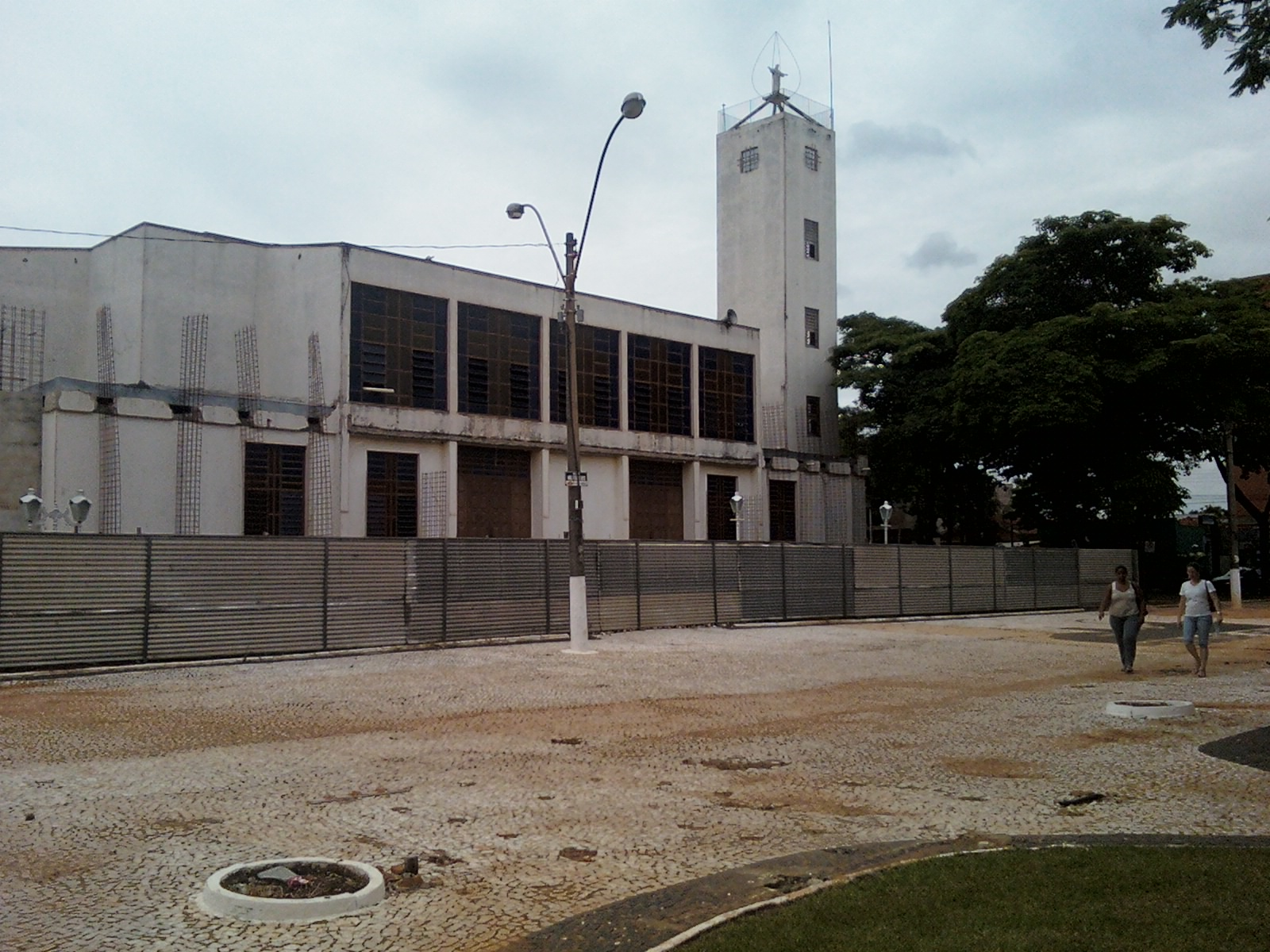
Sacred Heart of Jesus Parish, known as the Mother Church, under renovation.

Regarding the administration of the Catholic Church, the municipality is covered by the Archdiocese of Campinas. Since its origins, Paulínia has had a strong connection with Saint Benedict, a saint who is credited with ridding people of snake bites. There have always been many snakes in the region of Paulínia, and the saint was the way people found to prevent bites by saying a simple prayer: "Saint Benedict, rid me of this poisonous creature". The Saint was the patron saint of the locality until 1922, when Dom Paulo de Tarso Campos determined the Most Sacred Heart of Jesus as the patron saint of the parish, after Canon Samuel Fragoso organized a prayer group to that saint, on the occasion of the arrival of Father Pedro Tomazini, the first parish priest of Paulínia. The city has two parishes, Sacred Heart of Jesus and Our Lady of the Beautiful Branch, and several communities, such as St. Jude Thaddeus and St. Lucy, among others.

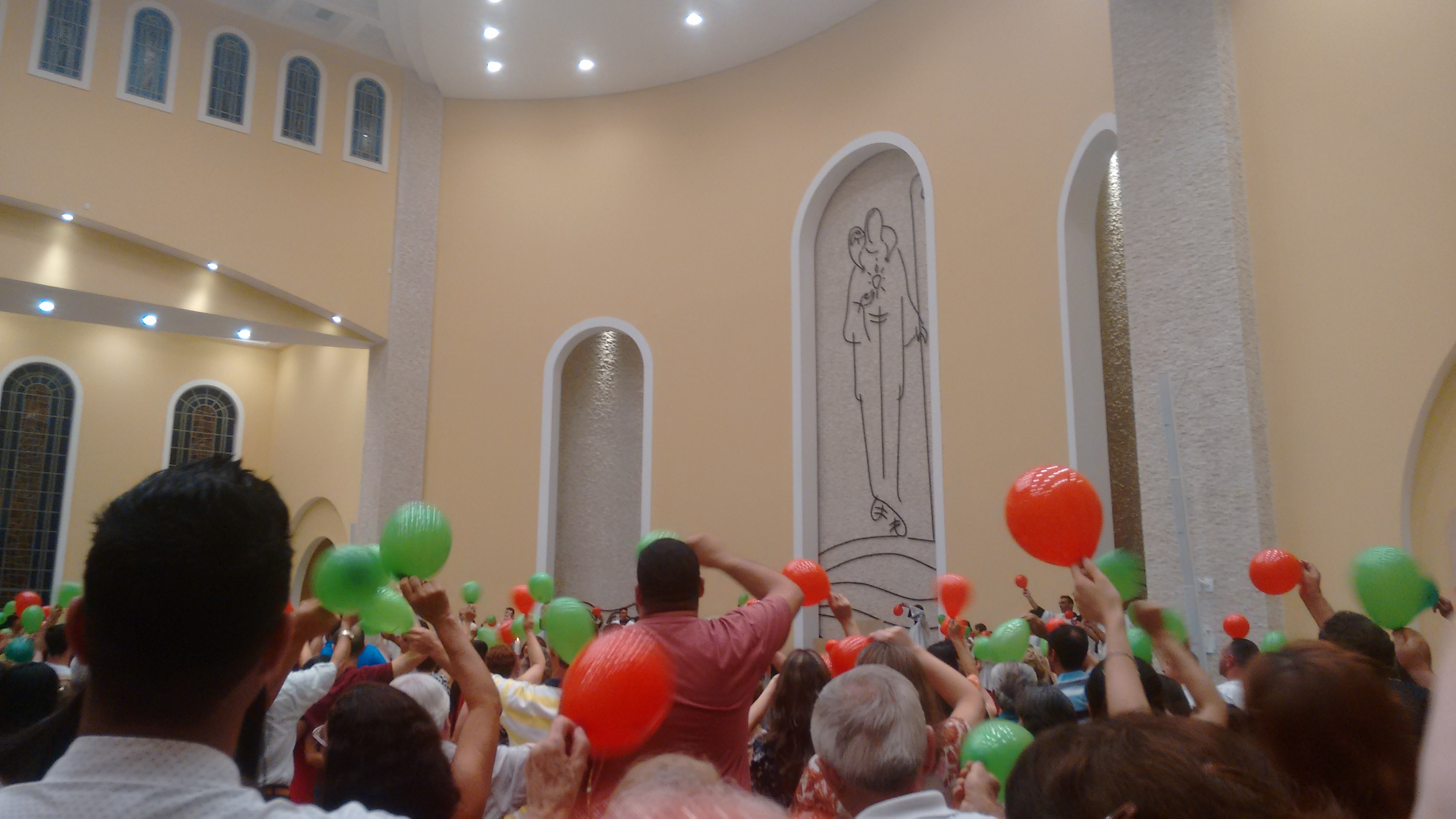
Image of the interior of the Mother Church of the city of Paulínia at the Misa de Gallo, at Christmas in the year 2017, after renovations.

The city has the most diverse Protestant or reformed creeds, such as the Lutheran Church, the Presbyterian Church, the Methodist Church, the Baptist Church, the Assembleias de Deus, the Universal Church of the Kingdom of God, the Jehovah's Witnesses, among others. Currently, the number of Protestants in Paulínia is growing.

Among other religions, Buddhism, Jehovah's Witnesses and the Church of World Messianity stand out in Paulínia in number of adherents, religions that have shown a small growth in recent years. Currently the municipality has 36,807 Catholics, 9,014 Protestants, 184 Messianics, 97 Buddhists, 388 Jehovah's Witnesses, 2,913 people with no religion and 1,923 people of other religions.

== Politics ==
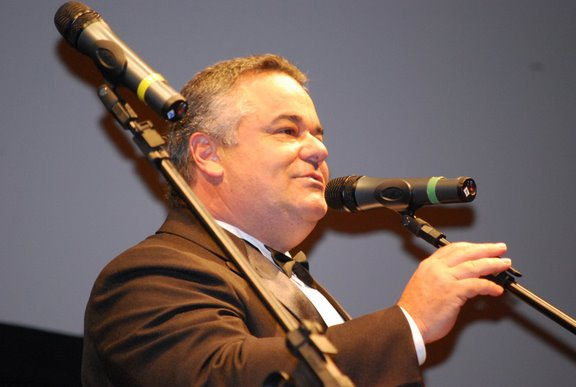
José Pavan Júnior, former mayor of Paulínia, speaks during the II Paulínia Film Festival, in 2009.

The executive power is represented by the mayor, assisted by his cabinet of secretaries, following the model proposed by the Federal Constitution. The first representative of the executive power and mayor of the municipality was José Lozano Araújo, elected soon after the emancipation of the town. In thirteen mandates, eleven mayors have passed through the City Hall of Paulínia. In the last few years, the position was held by Edson Moura, elected in 2000 and reelected in 2004. In 2009, José Pavan Júnior (PSB) took over the mayor's office, who was removed from office on 20 July of the same year. The interim mayor, Marcos Roberto Bolonhezi, took over until the 22nd, when Pavan returned to the mayor's office due to the suspension of the cassation.

The City Council represents the legislative power. It has ten councilmen, and is composed as follows: two seats from the PTdoB; two seats from the PSB; two seats from the Progressive Party (PP); one seat from the Brazilian Labor Party (PTB); one seat from the Christian Social Democratic Party (PSDC); one seat from the PCdoB, and one seat from the Workers' Party (PT).

The judicial power is represented by the Public Prosecutor's Office of Paulínia and by the courts; the Desembargador Plínio Coelho Brandão Labor Court, belonging to the 15th Region, underwent a remodeling in 2008 with the expansion of the total built area and of the areas of the secretariats of two labor courts. Paulínia also receives labor cases from Cosmópolis, and in 2007 the courts received 2,573 new lawsuits, settling 2,402. The Public Ministry has participated in several lawsuits against the city hall and companies, in cases such as Shell's contamination of the Recanto dos Pássaros neighborhood and the construction of a toll road on Professor Zeferino Vaz Highway. Paulínia is part of the comarca of Campinas.

== Subdivisions ==
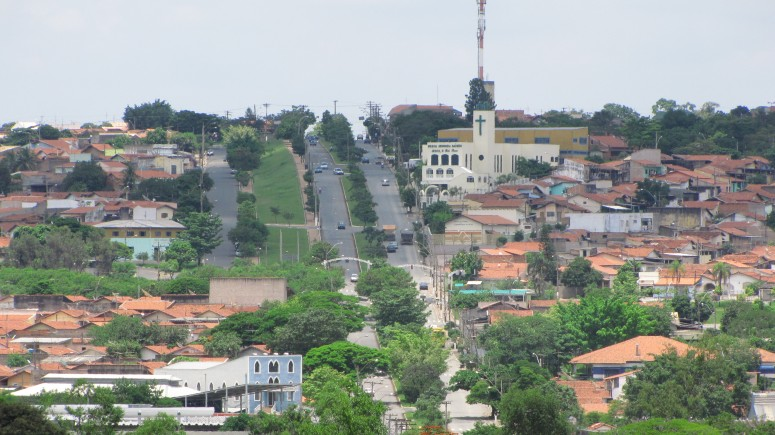
The Monte Alegre neighborhood, in the southern region, is one of the oldest in the city.

Paulínia's first division of neighborhoods was established on 30 October 1979, by Decree No. 1248/1979. That division established 21 neighborhoods and lasted until 1999. Paulínia's current neighborhood division was established by Municipal Law 2 229 of 21 January 1999, with changes made by Law 2 372 of 3 April 2000 and Law 3 008 of 31 August 2009. These Laws established 38 neighborhoods in Paulínia, but they did not delimit important subdivisions, such as São José (which is in the João Aranha area) and Ouro Negro (located in the Jardim Planalto area), despite the administration itself treating them as neighborhoods.

The oldest neighborhoods in Paulínia are João Aranha, Monte Alegre and the central neighborhoods. Currently Paulínia consists of 38 neighborhoods, as well as numerous subdivisions and the district of Betel. The municipality is divided into 5 main regions which are divided into 11 smaller sub-regions polarized by 17 main neighborhoods and encompassing several smaller neighborhoods. The municipality has few neighborhoods in the rural area, the largest being Recanto das Águas, Bela Vista II, Saltinho and São Bento. Most of the neighborhoods are in the city, due to the urbanization that the municipality has been undergoing.

== Economy ==
Paulínia's Exportations
Year	Exportations (R$)
2003	166.065.926
2004	240.058.507
2005	345.316.502
2006	387.935.929
2007	460.190.677
2008	578.336.315

Paulínia is the biggest petrochemical power in Latin America, being home to REPLAN, the biggest Petrobras and Brazilian refinery, besides having countless other establishments and industries in the sector, representing companies such as Transo, Shell, Exxon, Fic, Rhodia, among others, which, attracted by the good infrastructure and by advantages offered by the city hall, such as exemption or reduction in municipal taxes, have settled in the city. GDP per capita is quite high, as is its Gross Domestic Product, which is R$6,734,450, representing the 63rd city with the highest per capita income in Brazil. In addition to oil, Paulínia has food and mechanical industries. With the Paulínia Magia do Cinema project, an increase in companies linked to tourism and cinema is predicted. There are 346 industrial, 1679 commercial and 1305 service establishments in the municipality. The services sector employed the most in 2009, with 15,454 workers, followed by industry, which employed 9,020 people. The formal labor force in Paulínia was 43,304 people in 2001, the working age population was 26,281, and the consumption potential index was US$2,775. The municipality has 3,011 local units, according to IBGE data from 2005. The estimated budget for 2011 is R$892.1 million. In recent years, Paulínia's foreign trade has been growing, as shown in the table above.

=== Primary Sector ===
Sugarcane, Orange and Corn Production (2007)
Product	Harvested area (Hectares)	Production (Ton)
Sugarcane	3.677	275.780
Orange	357	9.513
Corn	40	144

Agriculture is of little importance in Paulínia. The main crops are sugar cane, corn and orange. The north-northwest regions used to stand out for the large orange production, but this culture has been losing space to the subdivision of land in the region, with the creation of neighborhoods such as São José and Marieta Dian. Sugar cane is still a highlight in the southern region, with large producing areas. In total, Paulínia has 380 farms, but most of them are small-sized.

According to the IBGE in 2006 Paulínia had a herd of 246 cattle, 334 pigs, 95 horses, 91 sheep, and 292,490 poultry, among these 182,490 chickens and 110,000 roosters, chickens and chicks. In 2006 the city produced 150,000 liters of milk from 97 cows. 3.285 million dozen hen eggs were produced.

Paulínia's permanent plantation produces mainly oranges (9,513 tons) and avocados (3,619 tons). Considering the relation between planted area and total harvested, the guava stands out, producing 45,000 kilos per hectare, and the tangerine, whose yield is 46,500 kilos per hectare. Coffee, which was very important in the past, has lost importance, and currently only 32 tons are produced.

=== Secondary Sector ===
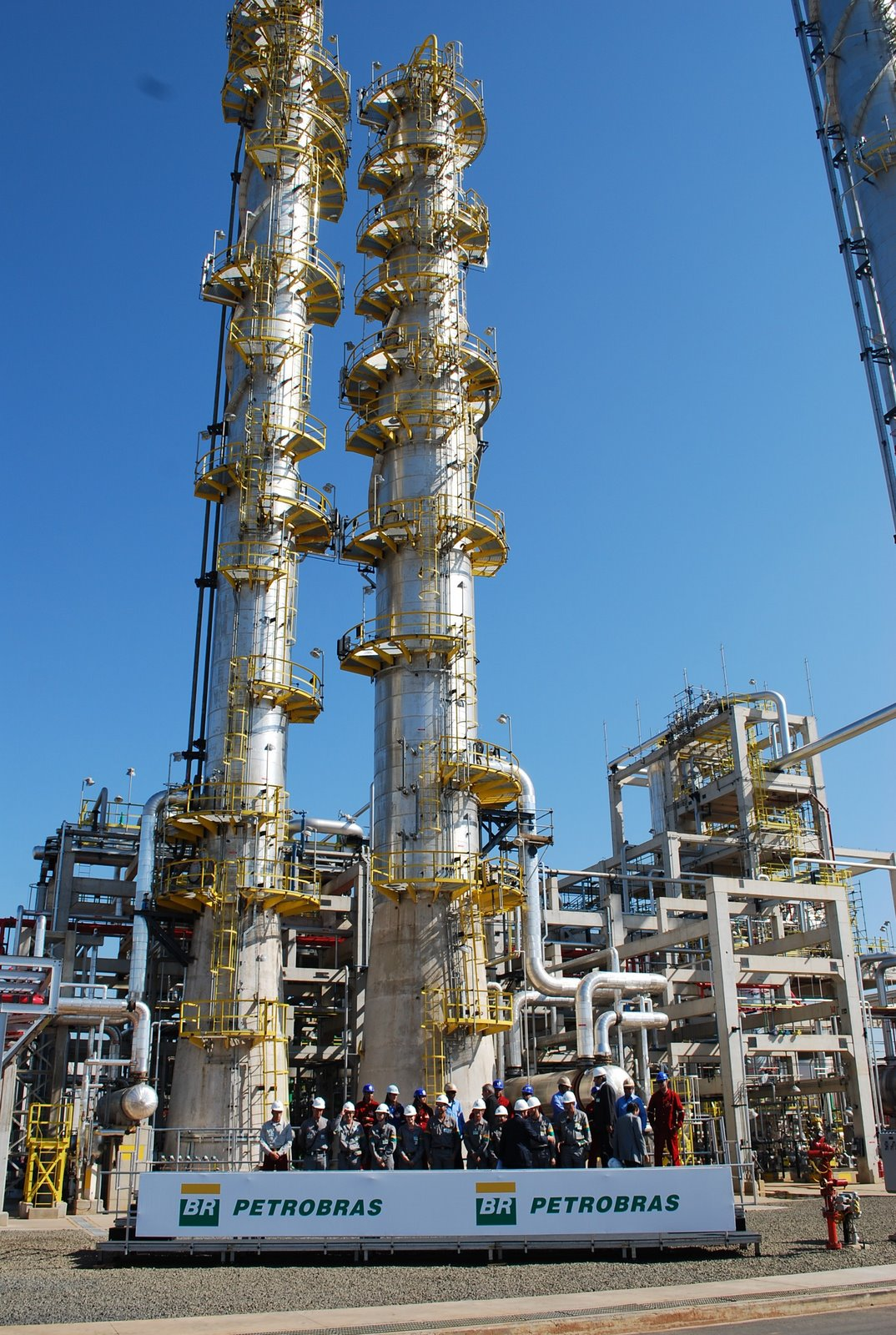
View of the propylene production unit towers, in REPLAN.

The secondary sector is currently the main source generating Paulínia's Gross Domestic Product. Represented mainly by the chemical and petrochemical industries, Paulínia's secondary sector is known for the large number of industries, especially multinationals, such as the American ExxonMobil and the New Zealand-British Shell. Paulínia's industrial development began with the installation of Rhodia on São Francisco farm, in 1942, when Paulínia still belonged to Campinas, but the main event occurred after emancipation, with the inauguration of REPLAN in 1972, which transformed the town into a large producer of refined petroleum. The industrial pole in Paulínia, formed by companies such as Petrobras, owner of Replan, Fic, Ipiranga, Eucatex and Rhodia makes the city the largest petrochemical pole in Latin America. Other companies stand out, such as Nutriara, from the food industry, Cargill and Purina, from the animal feed industry, AsGa, from the telecommunications industry, among others.

Replan is Petrobras' biggest refinery in terms of production. It produces several products, such as asphalt, kerosene, and gasoline, and its production is mainly sold to the state of São Paulo. It is responsible for about twelve billion reais per year in taxes paid to the government and for Paulínia's high per capita income.

Paulínia's industry is the third largest GDP generator in the Metropolitan Region of Campinas, smaller only than the neighboring metropolis, Campinas, and the city of Sumaré. The industrial sector accounts for almost 50% of Paulínia's GDP. Oil derivatives represent the most produced products in Paulínia, followed by other chemical products and food.

==== Petrochemical Pole ====
The largest chemical and petrochemical industrial complex in Brazil is located in the northern region of the municipality. Centered in the Planalto Paulista Refinery, there are also companies such as Rhodia, the first in the city, Shell, Ipiranga, ExxonMobil and Braskem. The center is responsible for a good part of the jobs and of the Gross Domestic Product of Paulínia, being one of the main reasons for attracting immigrants to the city.

=== Tertiary sector ===
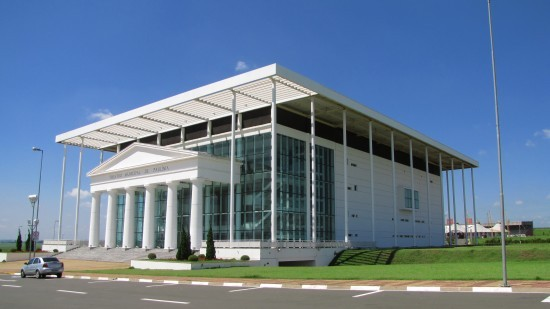
Municipal Theater of Paulínia.

Nationally, Paulínia's commerce is not outstanding. In the tertiary sector, the town is known for having a large cinema pole, built through the Paulínia Magia do Cinema project, and which has been the location for several films, such as O Menino da Porteira. Tourism is also important in the town.

José Paulino Avenue, in the center of Paulínia, has important commercial establishments, most of them being branches of large national chains. Other important commercial centers in Paulínia are the districts of Santa Cecília and Nova Paulínia, where Santa Cruz Street is located, headquarters of numerous medical clinics and other stores. The sector that most employs in Paulínia is the tertiary one, which at the beginning of 2001 employed 978 people.

In 2006 the city administration created the project Paulínia Magia do Cinema, with the goals of increasing tourism and boosting the economy. Through this project, the Paulínia Film Festival, Paulínia Cinematographic Pole, Magia do Cinema School and the Paulínia Film Commission were idealized. Several films have already been shot at the pole, such as O Menino da Porteira and Topografia de um Desnudo. The cinema pole is the result of one of the largest investments in audiovisual production in Brazil. Around 550 million reais from the administration and companies have already been spent on the project. Paulínia Magia do Cinema project has been highlighted in the national press due to the size of the investments.

==== Tourism ====
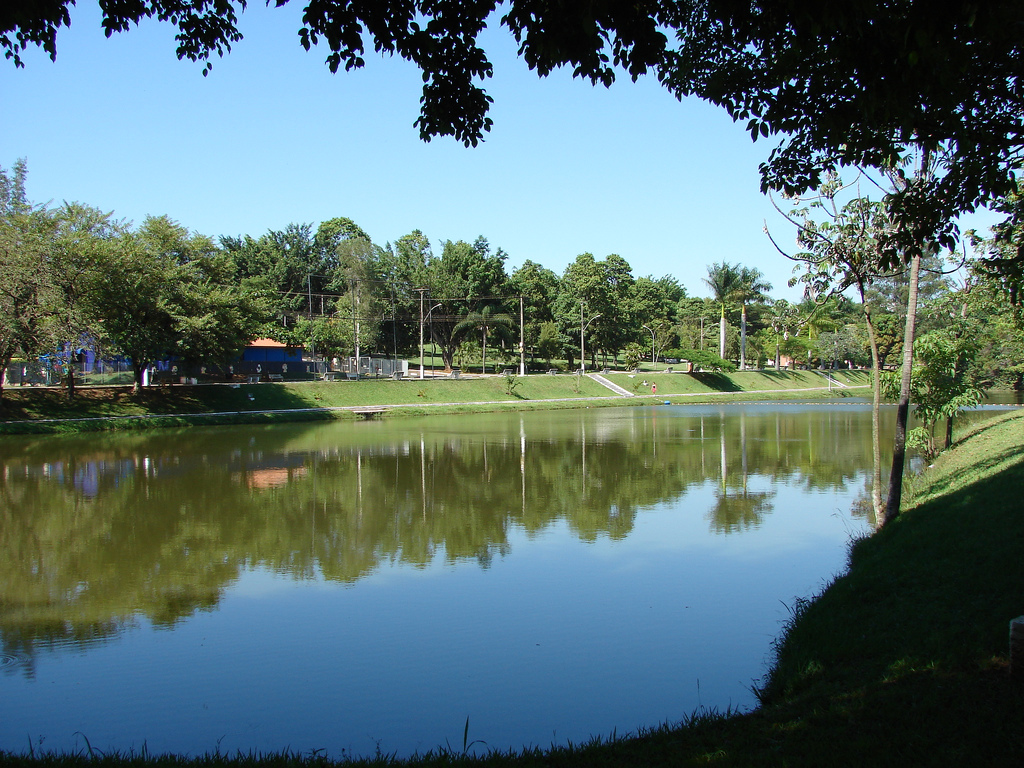
Parque José Maria Malavazzi, or Zeca Malavazzi, an important tourist attraction in Paulínia.

Paulínia has many tourist attractions. Among the most visited natural tourist spots are the minipantanal, the ecological park, and the Adelelmo Piva Júnior Botanical Garden, which still keeps animal and vegetal species preserved in their natural habitat. The virtual library, where the population has free access to the internet, and the Municipal Theater, part of Paulínia's cinematographic pole, are other important tourist attractions.

The portals located at the entrances to the city are symbols of Paulínia. With different styles, they are tourist attractions and have municipal guard posts. The main ones are the Medieval Portal, the Colonial, the Futuristic and the Parque Brasil 500. Paulínia's squares and traffic circles are also visited a lot thanks to the decoration made with several colorful plants, which form drawings of several shapes. The Paul Percy Harris square is known for having the largest Rotarian symbol in the world.

Other tourist attractions in Paulínia are the Cidade Feliz fountain, which supplies mineral water to the population, the bicycle cross track, where several competitions are held, such as Bicicross Américas, Zeca Malavazzi park, Brasil 500 park, the historical museum, Saint Benedict church, and the Sagrado Coração de Jesus square.

Paulínia's carnival is considered the largest in the Metropolitan Region of Campinas and is much appreciated by tourists, especially from towns in the area. The main schools are Hawaí 71, Ktoto, Unidos do João Aranha, among others. The samba school parades are held in the largest indoor sambodrome in Brazil.

Paulínia's events and tourist sites attract many tourists every year. Events such as Folia de Reis, Paulitália, which is a party in honor of the Italian immigrants in Paulínia, and the Christmas of Lights stand out.

== Urban Structure ==
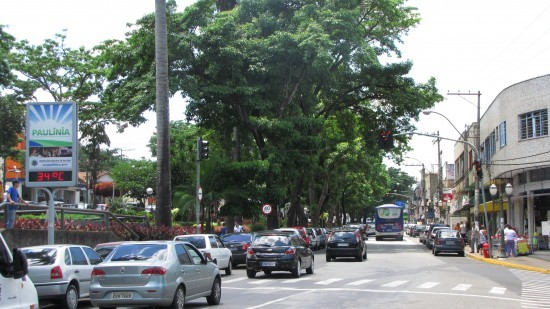
José Paulino Avenue, in downtown Paulínia.Image: Júlio Boaro

Paulínia has a great urban infrastructure. The city's water and sewage service is provided by Sabesp. The water consumed by the inhabitants of Paulínia comes from the Jaguari river, on the border with Cosmópolis, which undergoes treatment in the city's water treatment station. The city also has two important mineral water springs, one in the Cascata neighborhood and the other on the access to downtown.

The electric power is supplied by the company CPFL, which has several distribution centers in neighborhoods such as Cascata, Bela Vista and Santa Terezinha, as well as a substation near the São Francisco farm. In addition, there are several transmission towers, installed on the central beds and sidewalks of some avenues, such as Avenida José Padovani and Nelson Prosdócimo.

In the municipality there are two cemeteries, which are the Municipal Cemetery, in the center, and the Palm Tree Cemetery, in the Santa Terezinha neighborhood, as well as two post office distribution centers.

=== Security ===
As in most Brazilian medium and large cities, criminality is a serious problem in Paulínia. In 2006 the homicide rate in the municipality was 8.6, a fall of 39% compared to the 2002 rate, which was 22.1. In absolute numbers, the average of homicides in the decade of 2000 was 10.33 homicides per year. The rate of firearm-related deaths, after increasing between 2002 and 2004, started to decrease in 2005, and was 7.2 in 2006. The number of murders and robberies increased 2.8% from 1999 to 2004, and the number of deaths by assault rose 105.7% in the same period.

Drug trafficking is also present, and a recent concern is crack. With the pulverization of cracolândia, in São Paulo, many users went to cities in the interior, such as Paulínia. Currently places like Morro Alto and Marieta Dian neighborhoods, as well as São Bento Street, have points of sale and consumption of the drug. Another very common crime is theft (robbery without violence). In the first half of 2012, Paulínia was the municipality in the Metropolitan Region of Campinas with the most cases, in relation to the population. There were 90 cases per 10,000 inhabitants.

Paulínia has a police station located in the Santa Cecília neighborhood, which currently has Sandro Montanari as its delegate. There are also two community police stations in the city, one in João Aranha and the other in Betel. The city's portals have one guard post each, in order to patrol the entrances and exits of the city, but have been criticized for not having municipal guards on many occasions.

=== Education ===
Paulínia has schools in all regions of the municipality. Due to intense urbanization, rural residents have easy access to schools in nearby urban districts. Education in municipal schools has a higher level than in state schools, but the city government is creating studies to make state public education better, in order to achieve better results in IDEB.

Paulínia has 25 elementary, middle and high schools, besides 12 pre-schools. The technical schools ETEP and CEMEP stand out in Paulínia. The latter is considered the best school in Paulínia and offers computer, hardware, programming and high school courses.

In 2007 there were 12,037 elementary school enrollments, 3188 secondary school enrollments, 1380 higher education enrollments, and 3292 pre-school enrollments. There were 29 teachers in higher education in 2007.

Paulínia has a higher education institution, the Paulínia College, which is private. The city also has a Unicamp research center, the Pluridisciplinary Center for Chemical, Biological and Agricultural Research (CPQBA), located in the district of Betel.

Education level of the population in 2000
People aged 10 or older with no education or with less than one year of education	4,5%
People aged 10 or older with 1 to 3 years of schooling	14,6%
People aged 10 or older with 4 to 7 years of schooling	55,6%
People aged 10 or older with 8 to 10 years of schooling	13%
People aged 10 or older with 11 to 14 years of schooling	10,5%
People aged 10 or older with fifteen or more years of schooling	1,7%

=== Health ===
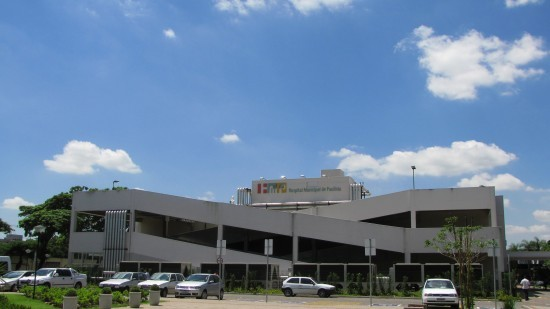
External view of the Paulínia's Municipal Hospital Vereador Antônio Orlando Navarro, after undergoing renovation.

Paulínia has 20 health establishments, 14 of which are public, including hospitals, emergency rooms, health posts, and dental services. The city has 106 beds for hospitalization in healthcare facilities, of which 83 are public and 23 private. There is also the CETREIM (Municipal Integrated Therapy and Rehabilitation Center) and the Preventive Health Center, being classified by SEADE as the 6th best in the Government region.

Until the beginning of the year 2000 Paulínia had few public health units, the only ones existing being the municipal hospital, a small health center in the João Aranha district and another in Nova Paulínia. From that year on new units started to be built due to the city's growth, since the original ones were not supporting the amount of services.

Paulínia's municipal hospital was built in the early 1980s and underwent its first major structural renovation in 2008, when the hospital's area was expanded, which made it possible to increase capacity and, consequently, services. Soon afterwards, other stages of the renovation began, consisting of the construction of a helipad to facilitate the transport of patients in serious condition to larger hospitals, such as the Clinics Hospital of the University of Campinas.

=== Communications ===
Paulínia has many means of communication, especially newspapers. The most traditional are Jornal de Paulínia, created in the 1960s by journalist Carlos Tontoli; Correio Paulinense, created by Mizael Marcelly; O Cromo; Agora Paulínia by Alexandre Mane; and Tribuna de Paulínia. Many newspapers from Paulínia also circulate in Cosmópolis and Artur Nogueira. The newspapers Notícia Já, Correio Popular, Folha de S.Paulo, O Estado de S. Paulo, Agora, Todo Dia, among others, also circulate in the city. There are four radio stations in the city: Paulínia FM, Matriz FM, A Mais FM, and Rádio Canção Nova AM.

In Paulínia there are dial-up and broadband (ADSL and radio) internet services being offered by several providers. In fixed-line telephony the city was initially served by Companhia Telefônica Brasileira (CTB) until 1973, when it started to be served by Telecomunicações de São Paulo (TELESP), which built the telephone exchanges used until today. In 1998 this company was privatized and sold to Telefónica, and in 2012 the company adopted the Vivo brand for its operations. The operators Vivo, TIM and Claro offer mobile phone service. Paulínia's area code is 19 and since the beginning of 2009, Paulínia is served by portability, as well as other 72 cities with an area code of 19 and a ZIP code that goes from 13140–001 to 13149–999. Portability is a service that makes it possible to change the operator without the need to change the phone number.

=== Transportation ===
Paulínia has a good highway-railroad network that connects it to several cities in the interior of the state and even to the capital. Paulínia is close to the Viracopos International Airport (IATA: VCP - ICAO: SBKP), one of the largest in the country, and has access to highways of state and even national importance through paved side roads with double lane, such as the Prefeito José Lozano Araújo road. Currently, the vehicle fleet in Paulínia is 24,448 cars, 1468 trucks, 1065 tractor trucks, 1970 pickup trucks, 5710 motorcycles, 227 buses and only 9 agricultural tractors. The Anhanguera, Bandeirantes and Dom Pedro I highways do not pass through the area of the municipality of Paulínia, but are easily accessible through side roads, besides SP-332 which is state highway.

The duplicated and paved avenues improve traffic in the city and some avenues on the outskirts relieve traffic in the city center. Traffic on the city's main avenue was being hampered by the growth in the number of vehicles in Paulínia, which forced the administration to improve the public road system to avoid overloading the city center. However, the fact that the northern region, separated from the other regions by the Atibaia river, is connected to these regions only by a bridge, between José Paulino Avenue and PLN 339, is already causing congestion in the latter and other tributary roads, such as São Bento and João Franco Cunha Streets. That is why projects to build another connection between the north and the other regions are already being analyzed.

==== Air Transportation ====
Paulínia doesn't have commercial airports in its territory. However, Viracopos Airport is located in the city of Campinas, 31 km from Paulínia's downtown, in the same Metropolitan Region of Campinas, serving the whole region with daily flights to São Paulo and other destinations. Besides Viracopos, the Campo dos Amarais Airport is located about 9 km from the city, also in Campinas.

==== Public roads ====
In Paulínia there is a system of public roads which allows access to other cities and highways without having to go through the city center. Due to the problems that José Paulino Avenue, in the city center, was facing with the excess of vehicles, avenues were built in the periphery that connect the neighborhoods to other neighborhoods and highways, such as the avenues Oswaldo Piva, Roma, and Expedicionários. With the concession of the SP-332 highway and the possible installation of a toll booth on it, there is the possibility of the center being used as an escape route, which would make the traffic problems return.

Paulínia's avenues are characterized by their large amount of trees, especially José Paulino and João Aranha avenues. With the afforestation of these avenues the administration aimed to improve the air quality of the main regions of the city and increase ecological tourism in the city.

==== Highways ====
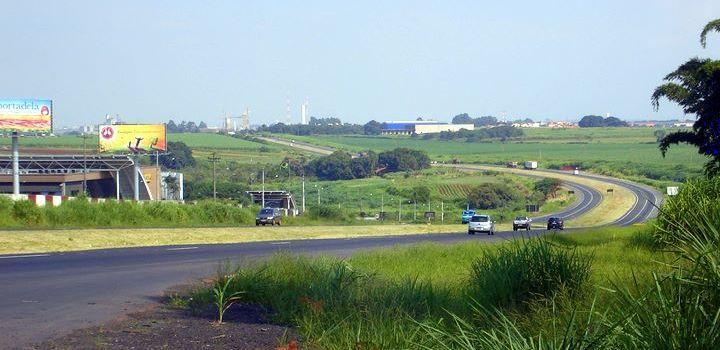
View of SP-332, the only state highway that passes through the town.

The main access to other cities in Paulínia is SP-332, or Professor Zeferino Vaz highway, which connects it to Campinas and Cosmópolis, and also to Dom Pedro I highway. Another external access to Paulínia is through the Doutor Roberto Moreira highway, which connects the city to Barão Geraldo. Prefeito José Lozano Araújo highway connects Paulínia to the cities of Sumaré and Hortolândia, and to Anhanguera and Bandeirantes highways. Other exits from Paulínia are PLN 311, located in the São José district and which connects to Cosmópolis and Americana, and PLN 313, which crosses the João Aranha, Viacava, Marieta Dian and Recanto das Águas districts, and also gives access to Americana and Cosmópolis, etc. Most of Paulínia's avenues are duplicated and most neighborhoods have paved streets, including some rural roads. Paulínia has the PLN 110 Road Complex, which provides access to various highways and avenues in the city.

==== Collective Transportation ====
Paulínia has about 15 circular bus lines that lead to all neighborhoods in the city. The city government subsidizes 56% of the value of the circular bus fare, which is equivalent to R$1.00. The main problems in Paulínia's public transportation are bus delays and crowding, results of a large number of users and the small number of vehicles circulating in the city.

==== Railroad Transportation ====
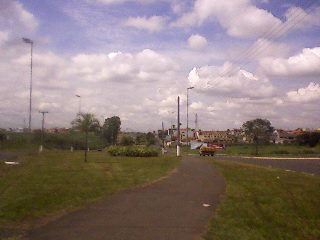
Bike path on João Aranha Avenue, in the neighborhood of the same name.

Paulínia is currently crossed by a railroad which connects Replan to other important regions. This railroad is part of the FEPASA railroad system, and near the Doutor Roberto Moreira Highway it splits, with one part going to Jaguariúna and the other to REPLAN and Cosmópolis. A partnership between the companies ALL and Katoen Natie has built a railroad linking Paulínia to the Port of Santos that facilitates the transport of containers from Paulínia.

==== Bike paths ====
Until the mid-1990s Paulínia had no bike path. In this period it was built a bike path on the central ridges of João Aranha, Fausto Pietrobom and Paulista Avenues, about 4.5 km long. Subsequently, a bike path was built on the central median of Antônio Batista Piva Avenue, measuring just over 1 km in length. There are also lanes for pedestrians and cyclists on the sidewalk of Duque de Caxias, José Paulino and José Lozano Araújo Avenues.

== Culture and leisure ==
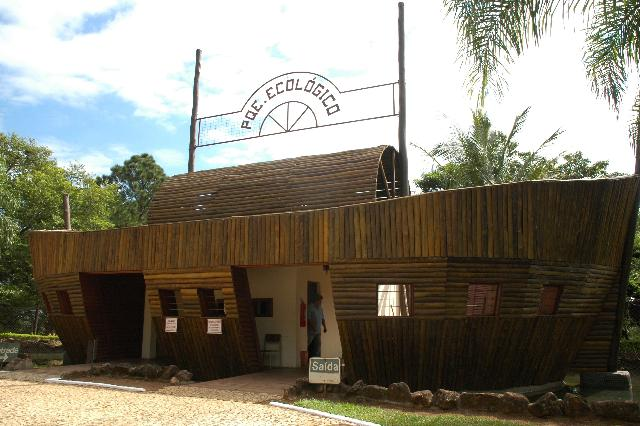
Paulínia's Ecological Park Armando Müller.

Among Paulínia's main leisure spots are São Bento Square, José Paulino Avenue, and Sagrado Coração de Jesus Square, where several events take place during the year.

Paulínia's municipal ecological park Armando Müller, located in the central region of the city, is used by the population for leisure and recreation. People use it to picnic and enjoy nature, since the park contains several animal and plant species. The large number of plants and trees at the site earns it the nickname "bosquinho" (English: little forest). Occupying an area of 65,000 m^{2} and divided into various ecosystems, the park has a total of 398 species, 240 wild, 41 exotic, and 117 domestic.

Another choice for leisure and culture is represented by the Municipal Theater of Paulínia, opened on 4 July 2008, built to receive, besides plays, events related to cinema, presentation of dances, besides other shows. The theater is also the stage for Paulínia Magia do Cinema, one of the main events in the city.

=== Cuisine ===
In Paulínia's menu, as well as in a large part of the state, it is common to find rice and beans, the basis of the meals, and steak, chicken, sausage, ground meat, and lettuce and tomato salad as side dishes. Due to its historical past, Paulínia is influenced by Italian cuisine, with the presence of pizza, pasta, sauces, etc. Besides these dishes, the so-called caipira food, a set of typical dishes from the countryside of São Paulo, is very popular in the city. Among this type of food, several types of farofas, caipira chicken, and pamonha stand out. The sugarcanejuice, paçoca, and, more recently, the so-called fast dishes, which have been conquering more and more space in the country, are also popular. In Campinas there is the Campinas Gastronomic Festival, which brings together restaurants from the city and the region, preparing countless typical local dishes.

=== Arts ===
The fact that the city is home to Agostinho Batista de Freitas, a naïve painter who characterized himself as a painter of urban landscapes, and who was presented at the Venice Biennale in 1961, stands out in the art of São Paulo. Furthermore, the city does not have an art scene of national importance, except for the performing arts. The main artistic event in the city is Expo Art, an event held annually since 2008, which aims to promote artists from São Paulo.

In the city there is a program aimed at fostering art in the municipality called Espaço Ação & Arte (English: Action & Art Space). The program, coordinated by Paulínia's Community Action Center (CACO), aims to qualify people, generating work and income through the appreciation of artistic activities. The program's main action is the handicraft workshops, which promote the learning of craft techniques, such as fabric painting, embroidery, and knitting.

=== Literature and performing arts ===
Paulínia has little tradition in literature and performing arts, but in spite of this, with the advent of the project Paulínia Magia do Cinema, these artistic manifestations have been more encouraged by the administration. In 2009, there was the Analysis and Merit Process for Obtaining the Professional Qualification Certificate from SATED/SP, which qualified 27 performing arts professionals, the largest recorded in the interior of São Paulo up to that date. In the same year the Virada Cultural Paulista took place in the city, and the highlight in the scenic arts was a children's musical from the city itself.

Some artistic institutions that stand out in the city are Ceart-Center for the Arts in Paulínia and the Culture Space (Magia do Cinema School). The first is a theater group that performs musicals such as Os Saltimbancos, Para Viver um Grande Amor (with poems from the book of the same name by Vinicius de Moraes) and Roda Viva. The group is formed by actors from Paulínia and its cast interprets and sings live on stage. The Magia do Cinema School, on the other hand, is an initiative of the city hall through the project Paulínia Magia do Cinema. It offers courses in the areas of cinema, theater, dance, and music, such as stage characterization, dramatic literature, history of art and theater, among others. This school, in partnership with Getulio Vargas Foundation and Senac, aims to train qualified professionals in the area of cinema and theater to enter the job market created with the project Paulínia Magia do Cinema. In Paulínia's literature, the highlight is Raimundo Lonato, who has written several books for children and teenagers, literature-reportage and poems. The writer has already been present in events such as the Porto Alegre Book Fair and the 20th São Paulo Biennial Book Fair.

=== Sports ===
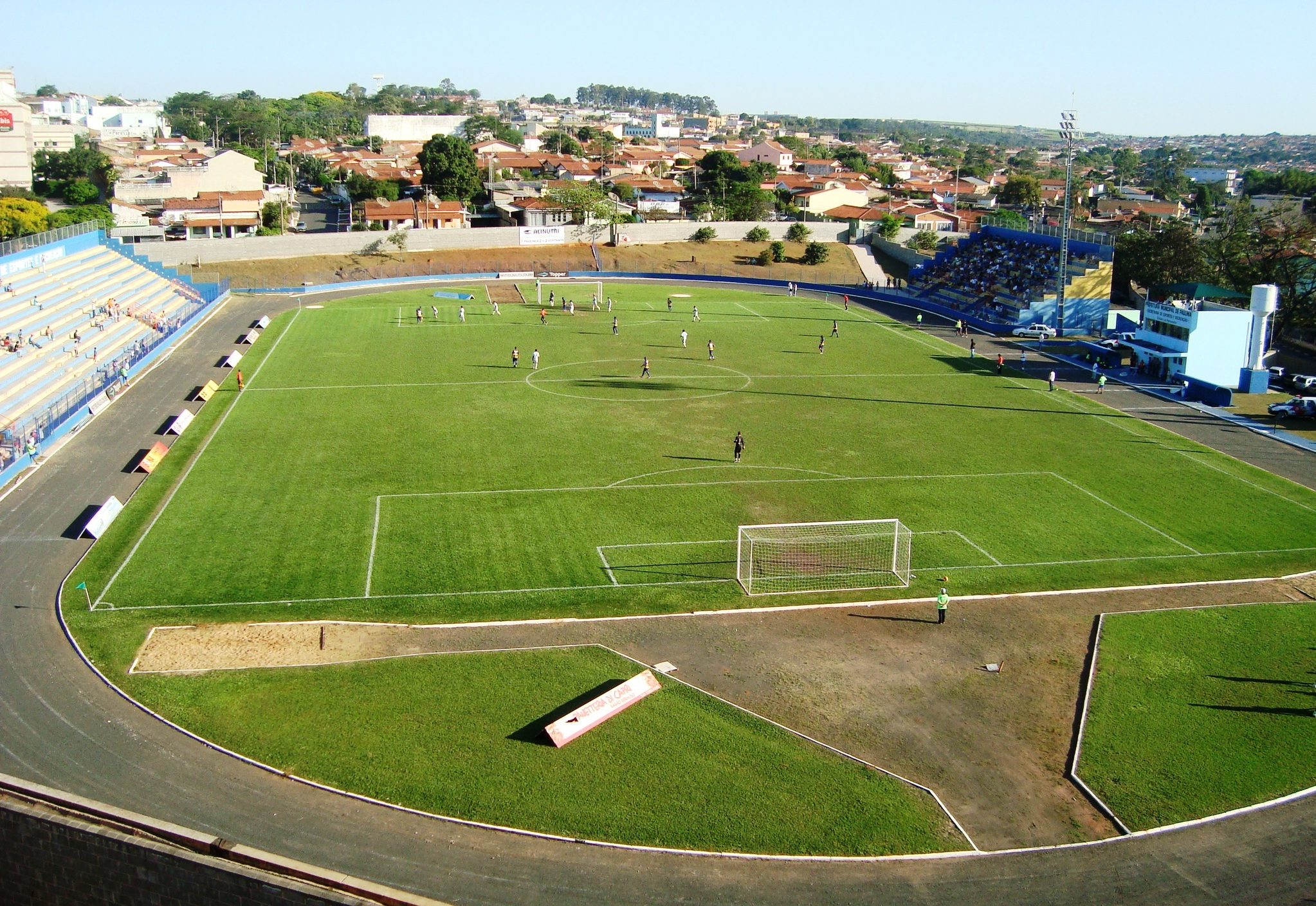
The Luís Perissinotto Municipal Stadium, with capacity for 10,070 people, is used for soccer matches and is Paulínia's home ground.

Soccer has always been one of the most popular sports in Paulínia. Before emancipation, bocce shared with soccer the title of most popular sport in the locality. After emancipation, the first municipal incentive for sports was the creation of the Municipal Sports Commission by Mayor Vicente Amatte, in 1973. After some time, the agency became subordinated to the Sports and Tourism Sector (Setur). In 1976, Setur's supervisor, Ary Rodriguez, created the Workers' Sports Games, which are still a success in the city today.

In 1993, the then mayor Edson Moura created the Secretariat of Sports and Recreation. From then on, several projects to encourage the practice of sports were developed, such as the participation in Regional Games and in the Countryside Open Games. In 2005 the city had the best passage through the Open Games to that date: 3rd place, behind Campinas and Araras. Other events organized by Secretariat are the vacation gymkhana, which is in its 20th edition; the Municipal Futsal Championship, which went to its 25th edition in 2010.

Recently, soccer has been highlighted again with Paulínia Futebol Clube, the first professional club in the city that competes in the B series of the Campeonato Paulista. The city also has the Luís Perissinoto Municipal Stadium and several fields. Teams often train at Paulínia's training centers or at the stadium, due to the good conditions of the grass. The Paulínia Amateur Soccer Championship also takes place in the municipality, which has been played since 1970. In 2010 the tournament was divided into two divisions, with 16 teams in the First Division and 41 teams in the Second, and in 2011 the Second Division had only 16 teams, and the Third Division was created. The games are held in several different locations, being the fields in the Morumbi, Santa Cecilia, São José, Serra Azul, the Etori di'Blásio Sports Center (Monte Alegre neighborhood), the Waldemar Perissinoto square sports center, and the Agostinho Fávaro Gymnasium field (João Aranha neighborhood).

Paulínia has a great tradition in motocross, with one of the best teams in Brazil. The Petrobrás/Paulínia team has several Brazilian, State and international titles. The team originated in the Paulínia Racing Bicicross project, created by the city hall to encourage the sport in the city. Currently, the team is seven-time Brazilian and São Paulo State champion. The city also hosted for several years the Bicicross Americas, one of the greatest competitions in Brazil and in the continent.

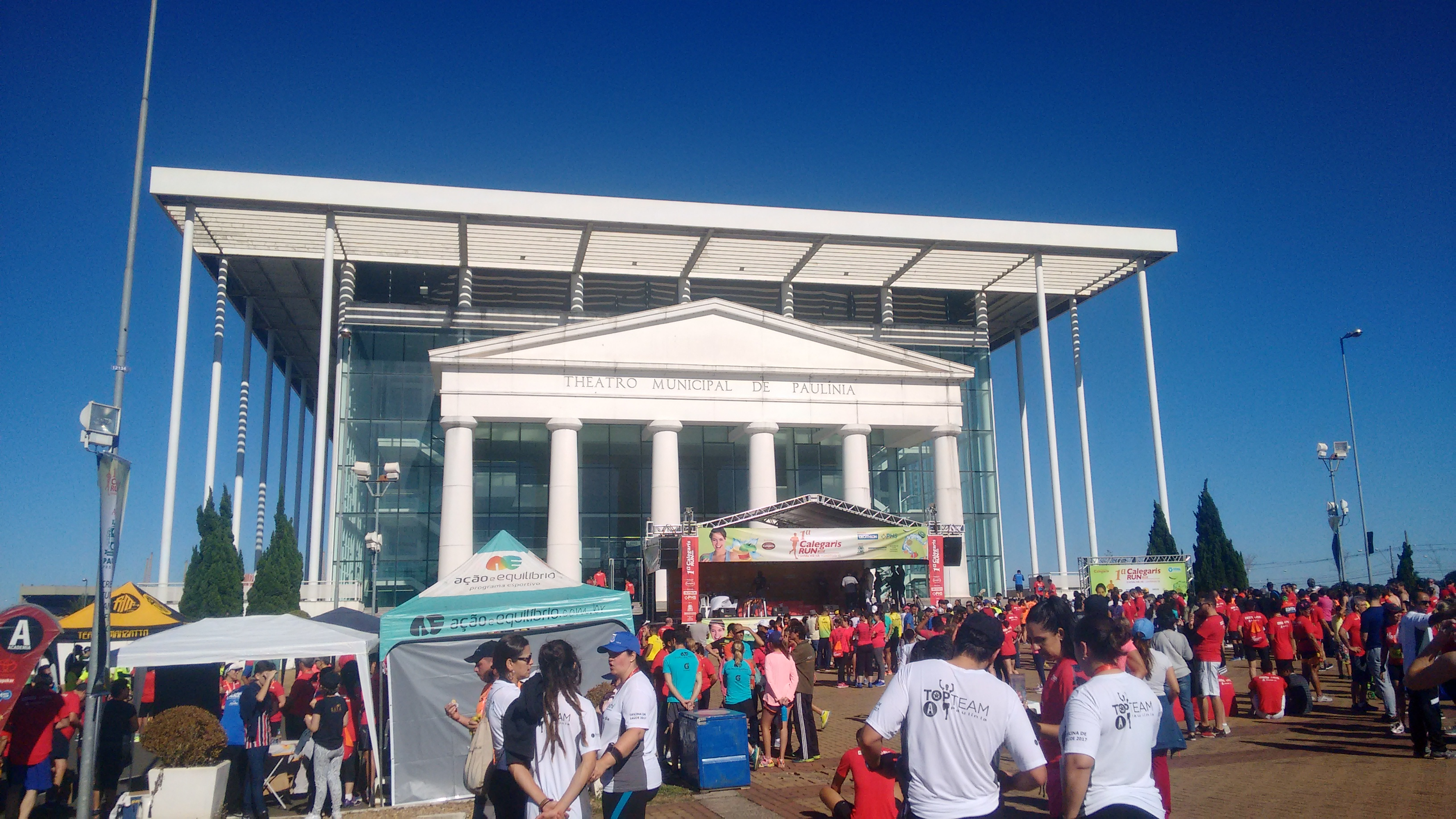
Municipal Theater of Paulínia - 1st Calegaris Run - Run and Walk sports event in the city of Paulínia. Start and finish points at the Theater.

Other popular sports in Paulínia are basketball, handball and volleyball. Basketball is governed by the Friends of Basketball Association of Paulínia (AAB Paulínia), which coordinates the men's, women's and junior men's basketball club teams in Paulínia. In handball, the SER/UH/Paulínia team stands out, maintained by the city hall. The team is associated with the Handball League of the State of São Paulo, alternative association of the sport in the state. In volleyball, the teams that participate in the Regional Games and in the Interior Open Games stand out. The teams in these three sports use the sports gyms Agostinho Fávaro, located in João Aranha, and Vicente Amatte, located in Santa Cecília.

Recently the sports modality of street running has been growing among the population, and there have been events organized with support from the City Hall. Noteworthy are the running and walking events promoted by the Paulinense Sports Association (AEP) and by local businesses, such as the 1st Calegaris Run in 2017, organized by the supermarket chain that gives its name to the event.

=== Holidays ===
In Paulínia there are five municipal holidays, eight national holidays and, in 2012, three optional workdays. The municipal holidays are the day of political-administrative emancipation of Paulínia, on 28 February; Good Friday, on 6 April; Corpus Christi, on 7 June; Sacred Heart of Jesus Day (patron saint of Paulínia), on the eighth day after Corpus Christi (15 June); and the civil holiday of the day of the Constitutionalist Soldier, on 9 July. Except for the 28 February and 9 July holidays, all have moving dates. In 2012, the optional workdays were: Carnival Monday, 20 February; Carnival Tuesday, 21 February; Ash Wednesday, 22 February. However, the optional workdays can be changed, deleted or even created during the year, by decree of the mayor. In the case of optional workdays, services considered essential to the population cannot be interrupted.

== See also ==
- List of municipalities in São Paulo
- Interior of São Paulo

== Bibliography ==
=== Newspapers ===
- Jornal de Paulínia. Paulínia-SP
- Jornal Tribuna. Paulínia-SP
- Jornal Agora Paulínia. Paulínia- SP

=== Magazines ===
- BEZERRA, Thaís. "A história de Paulínia passada a limpo". Revista Tribuna.

=== Books ===
- SOARES, Meire Terezinha Müller; MAZIEIRO, Maria das Dores Soares; VALE, Sérgio (2006). Paulínia, dos Trilhos de Carril às Chamas do Progresso. Editora Komedi. ISBN 85-7582-268-3.
