= Mata de Santa Genebra =

- Portuguese: Área de Relevante Interesse Ecológico Mata de Santa Genebra
- IUCN category IV (habitat/species management area)
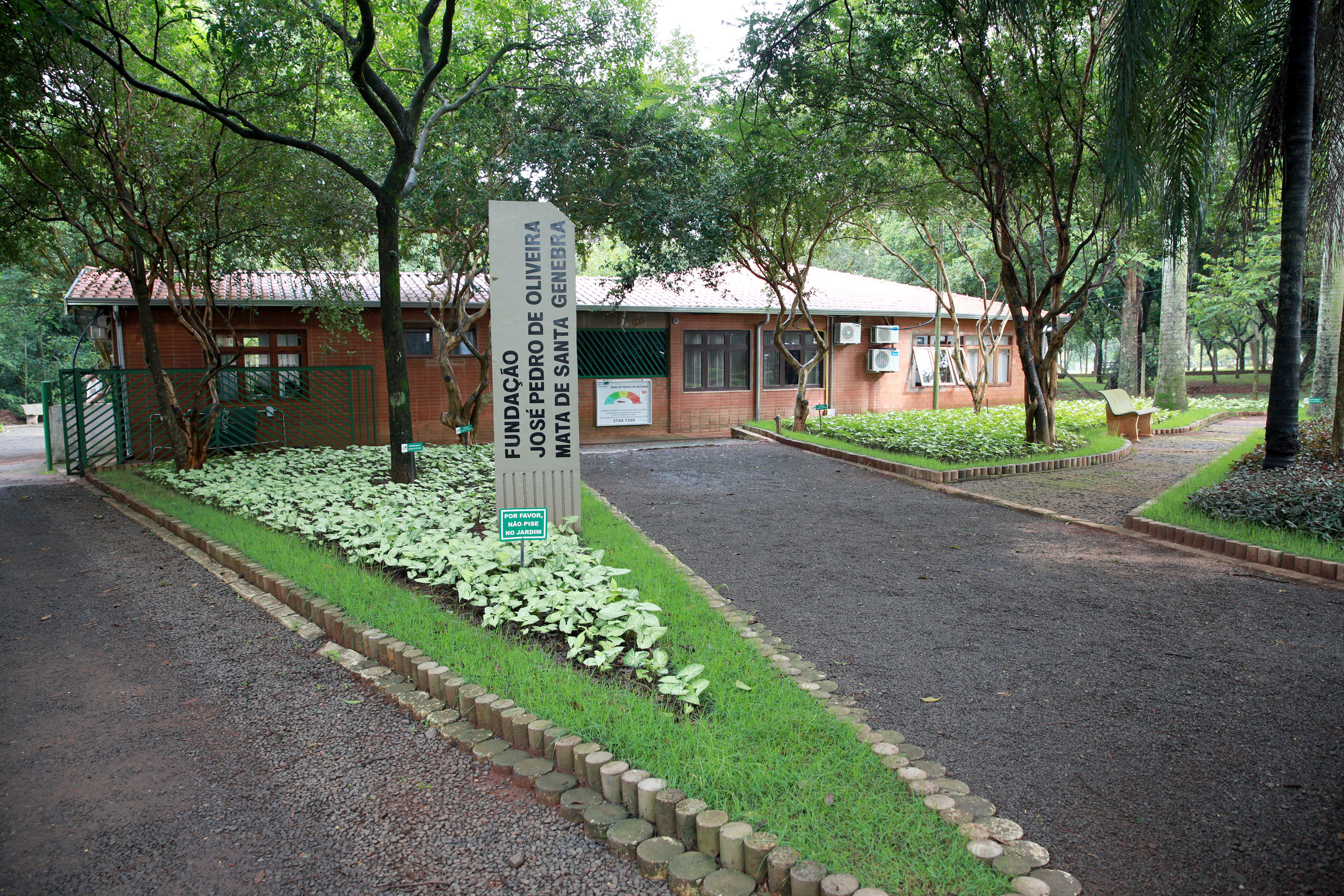
- Entrance to the area

- Location within Brazil
- Nearest city: Campinas, São Paulo
- Coordinates: 22°49′16″S 47°06′41″W
- Area: 252 hectares (620 acres)
- Designation: Area of Relevant Ecological Interest
- Created: 5 November 1985
- Administrator: ICMBio
- Website: www.santagenebra.org.br

Mata de Santa Genebra (Saint Geneva Forest) is an area of relevant ecological interest in the state of São Paulo, Brazil.

== History ==
The area was originally part of the Fazenda Santa Genebra, a coffee plantation owned by Baron Geraldo de Resende, which covered the present Barão Geraldo de Resende district and some parts of the city of Campinas. The Baron invested heavily in new technology for his plantation and went bankrupt. His lands were auctioned off, and the Oliveira family bought the part that holds the forest, which they preserved. José Pedro de Oliveira, who became owner, thought that the fresh air of the forest would help control his tuberculosis. After his death his widow donated the forest to the municipality.

On the date of the donation, 14 July 1981, the Fundação José Pedro de Oliveira was established to use the forest for strictly scientific and cultural purposes. In 1983 Mata de Santa Genebra was designated a National Heritage area. Mata de Santa Genebra Area of Relevant Ecological Interest was created by decree 91.885 on 5 November 1985.

== Location ==
Mata de Santa Genebra has an area of 252 hectares (620 acres). The conservation unit covers parts of the municipalities of Campinas and Paulínia in the state of São Paulo. The unit is jointly administered by the Federal Chico Mendes Institute for Biodiversity Conservation and by the city of Campinas represented by the Fundação José Pedro de Oliveira.

Altitude ranges from 585 to 615 metres (1,919 to 2,018 ft). The terrain mainly takes the form of shallow sloped hollows holding deep and mature clay soils. Temperatures range from 0 to 38 °C (32 to 100 °F) with an average of 22 °C (72 °F). The unit is in the Atlantic Forest biome. 92% of the area is covered by semi-deciduous upland forest, and 8% by swamp forest. The unit holds a remnant of semi-deciduous forest in the centre of a highly populated region, the Campinas Metropolitan Region. Human actions and natural causes have degraded some of the natural plant communities, and the unit now contains areas of secondary growth.

== Conservation ==
Mata de Santa Genebra is classified as IUCN protected area category IV (habitat/species management area). The objective with this category is to maintain natural ecosystems of regional or local importance and regulate use to support conservation of nature.

== Sources ==
- Arie Mata de Santa Genebra (in Portuguese), Chico Mendes Institute for Biodiversity Conservation
- Histórico (in Portuguese), Fundação José Pedro de Oliveira, archived from the original on 2016-05-03
- Unidade de Conservação: Área de Relevante Interesse Ecológico Mata de Santa Genebra (in Portuguese), MMA: Ministério do Meio Ambiente
