= Rodovia Doutor Roberto Moreira =

Highway in São Paulo, Brazil

Coordinates: 22°45′32.54″S 47°08′26.32″W

- Estrada da Rhodia

Route information
- Length: 14.35 km (8.92 mi)

Major junctions
- North end: Rua Manuel de Souza Filho and Rua Eugênio Beraldo in Paulínia, SP
- SP-332
- South end: Avenida Albino José Barbosa de Oliveira in Barão Geraldo, Campinas, SP

Location
- Country: Brazil
- State: São Paulo

Highway system
- Highways in Brazil; Federal

Rodovia Doutor Roberto Moreira (official designation PLN-010, also known as Estrada da Rhodia) is a highway in the state of São Paulo, Brazil.

Just 19 km long, this double-lane highway has high traffic within the urban zones of Paulínia. It is maintained by the Paulínia City Hall. It is best known as the road that connects the city of Paulínia to the subdistrict of Betel and the town of Campinas (subdistrict Barão Geraldo). As of 2021–2022, the road has wildlife crossing structures that allow animals to safely cross over the road.

== Cities ==
- Paulínia
- Campinas

== See also ==
- Highway system of São Paulo
- Brazilian Highway System
