= Brazilian Silicon Valley =

Brazilian geographical term

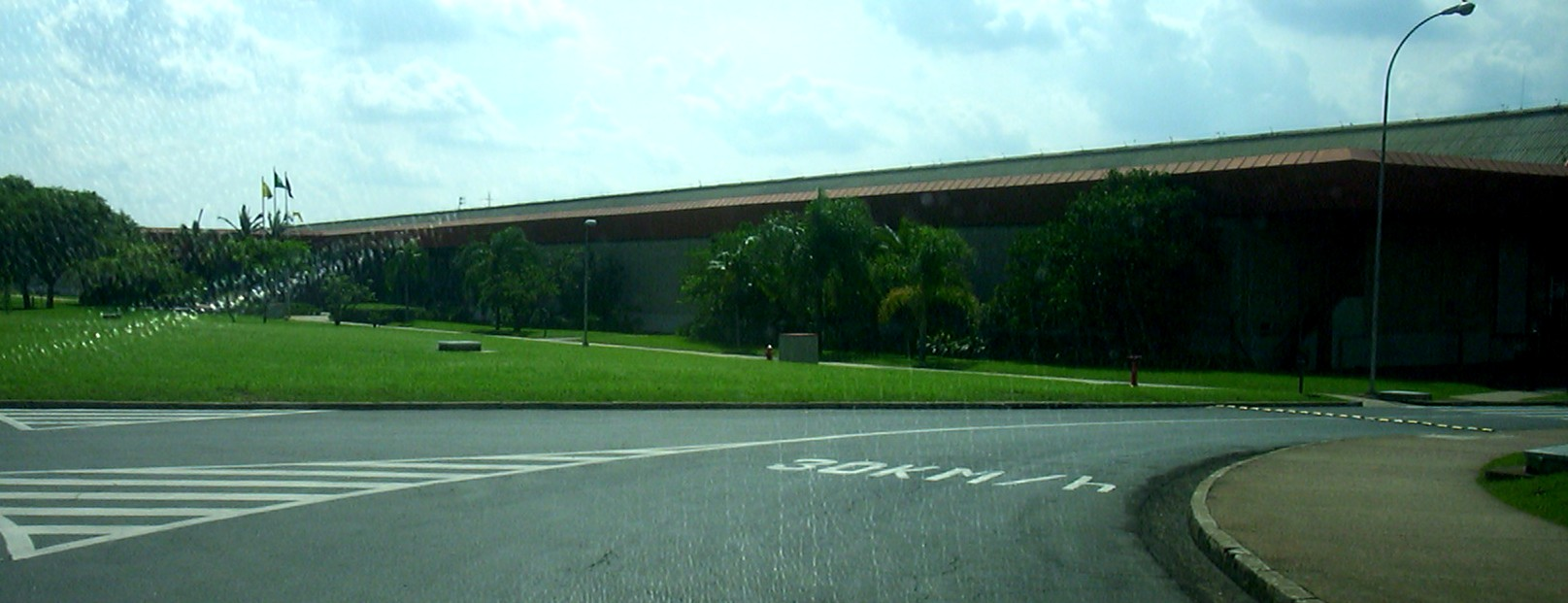
Main building of IBM Brazil in Hortolândia, Campinas.

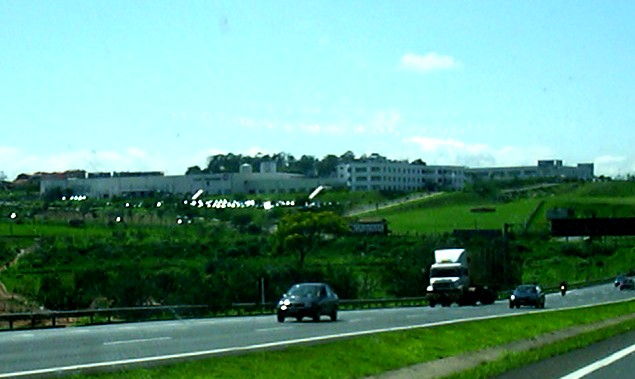
Main building of Lucent Brazil in Campinas.

Brazilian Silicon Valley is a term commonly applied to the region of Campinas and in southern region this term is applied for Florianópolis city, Brazil because of its similarity to the "original" Silicon Valley, located in California, United States.

== Characteristics ==
Campinas has gained this distinction because it has several comparable features, such as:

- It is a modern city, located near a giant metropolis, São Paulo
- It has a vibrant, high-tech university and research environment, composed of the University of Campinas (UNICAMP), the Pontificial Catholic University of Campinas (PUCCAMP), the FACAMP, the UNISAL (Centro Universitário Salesiano de São Paulo), the Center for Research and Development in Telecommunications (CPqD), the National Laboratory of Synchrotron Light, the Renato Archer Research Institute (CenPRA), the Brazilian Company of Agricultural Research (EMBRAPA), the Agronomical Institute of Campinas, the Biological Institute, the Food Technology Institute, the Eldorado Institute, the Werner von Braun Institute and several others. Campinas boasts a researcher/population ratio equal to those of the most advanced technology centers, and has also contributed to developments in artificial intelligence in the Brazilian industry.
- A number of high-tech, non-pollutant electrical and electronics industries have settled around Campinas, such as IBM, Lucent, Samsung, Nortel, Compaq, Freescale Semiconductor, Motorola, Dell, Fairchild Semiconductor, Huawei, 3M, Texas Instruments, Celestica, Solectron, and Bosch.
- Several industrial parks and incubators for high tech companies in the fields of microelectronics, computers, software, telecommunications, etc. have developed there.

== History ==
Until the 1970s, the Campinas region had few industries and had an economy based on agriculture and in the services and commerce sectors. With the foundation of UNICAMP and the ready availability of high-quality researchers, engineers and students focused on physics, electrical engineering, computer sciences, mathematics, mechanical engineering, etc., a number of high-tech companies started to establish their industrial plants and R&D labs nearby, such as IBM. The municipality of Campinas and those surrounding it began to foster actively the growth of this new area, and the CIATEC I and II (Companhia de Desenvolvimento do Pólo de Alta Tecnologia de Campinas) industrial zones were established around the university campus, in the subdistrict of Barão Geraldo. The Center for Research and Development (CPqD) set up by Telebras, a state holding for the telecommunications industry in Brazil, which had grown enormously under the military regime umbrella, was the second boost to Campinas Silicon Valley. A law was passed by the Federal government, protecting Brazilian-made technology against imports, and this resulted in further growth. Together with UNICAMP researchers a number of pioneering developments occurred in the brand-new areas of lasers, fiber optics, digital telephony, computer technology, software development, and so on. In addition, the Petrobras state-owned oil giant was starting to develop a long range oil exploration program with the aim of making Brazil independent of oil imports, a policy also started by the military for strategic and economic reasons (the oil shock had deeply affected the country), and UNICAMP was one of the leading research universities to participate. In this respect, UNICAMP's open philosophy of collaboration with the private sector (unheard of in Brazil until that time), established by his visionary founder and first rector, Dr. Zeferino Vaz, prepared the way for a unique synergy between industry and university.

== Other areas ==
Other areas in Brazil are also claiming a similar status to Campinas Silicon Valley, although they are much less organized and with smaller companies. They are:

- Araraquara and São Carlos, State of São Paulo, with a high technology industries and University of São Paulo - USP, Federal University of São Carlos - UFSCar and Universidade Estadual Paulista Júlio de Mesquita Filho - UNESP.
- Recife, state of Pernambuco, with a budding Digital Port and many collaborative ties with the Universidade Federal de Pernambuco
- The Vale do Sapucaí in Minas Gerais, with several cities (such as Santa Rita do Sapucai) where collaboration between high-tech industries and universities (such as INATEL) is generally recognized as one of the best examples of a nascent Silicon Valley.
- Belo Horizonte, state of Minas Gerais, not properly a Silicon Valley because it has mostly a software industry, but the upcoming BHTec along with possible semiconductor industry developments in its metropolitan area (specifically, in Confins) could change this situation.
- Florianópolis, state of Santa Catarina, also has mostly a software industry.
- The cities of Rio de Janeiro, Porto Alegre, Curitiba, Blumenau and Londrina, all in the Southeast and South, have also a strongly developed digital economy.

== See also ==
- List of places with 'Silicon' names

== Bibliography ==
- Lahorgue, M. "A Science and Technology Park as a Tool for the Consolidation of Life Sciences Cluster: The Case of Porto Alegre Technopole", Center for Economic Development, Bulgaria.
