= São José, Paulínia =

Neighborhood in Paulínia, Brazil

Coordinates: 22°43′20.00″S 47°10′30.07″W

São José is a neighborhood in the Brazilian city of Paulínia. The city had 12,653 inhabitants as of 2008.

== Geography ==
=== Regions ===
The neighborhood is divided into five regions (or sub-neighborhoods):

- São José ou Nova Paulínia
- São José II
- Condomínio Residencial João Vieira
- Campos do Conde Paulínia
- Campos do Conde Paulínia II
