= Geraldo Ribeiro de Sousa Resende, Baron Geraldo of Resende =

Brazilian aristocrat and politician (1847–1907)

Geraldo Ribeiro de Sousa Resende
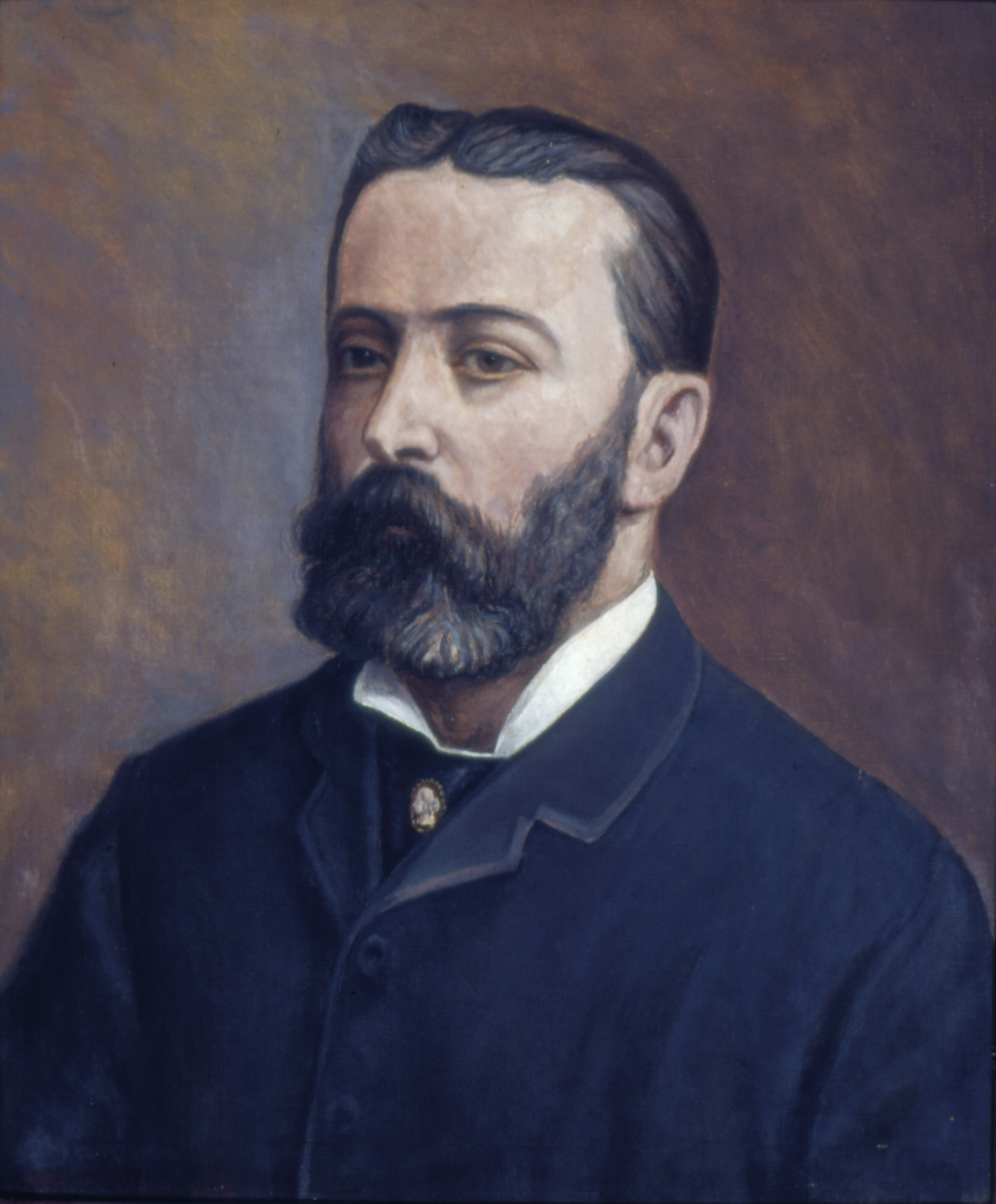

Personal details
- Born: 19 April 1846 Rio de Janeiro, Empire of Brazil
- Died: 1 October 1907 (aged 61) Campinas, Brazil

Geraldo Ribeiro de Sousa Resende, the Baron Geraldo of Resende (1847–1907) was a Brazilian aristocrat and land owner of the Empire of Brazil, farmer and politician of the city of Campinas, São Paulo, Brazil.

== Life ==
Geraldo Ribeiro de Sousa Resende was born in Rio de Janeiro, on 19 April 1847, to the aristocratic and military family of the Marquis and Marquess of Valença. He studied in Paris, France. His mother's family had acquired the farm of Santa Genebra, in Campinas, and after her death, young Geraldo de Resende decided to settle there in 1870. The farm was semi-ruined and worthless, but with characteristic vigor and entrepreneurship, he transformed and expanded it into one of the most productive farms of the region, with extensive sugarcane and coffee plantations. The Baron was known for his modernity regarding the use of new methods and machinery in agriculture and was one of the founders of the Club da Lavoura in 1878, a club of wealthy and progressive farmers. In 1876 he married D. Maria Amélia Barbosa de Oliveira.

Inevitably, the Club became politically influential soon after, and many of its members involved themselves in local and state conservative politics, so Barão Geraldo of Resende was no exception. He was elected councilman from 1883 to 1886, president of the local chapter of the pro-monarchic Conservative Party, and state congressman by the 7th District of São Paulo in 1886. On 20 January 1889 he was awarded by royal decree the title of Baron of Iporanga. By his own request, the title was changed by another decree dated 19 June of the same year to "Baron Geraldo of Resende". Like many of his colleagues he bitterly abandoned politics after the fall of the monarchy in 1889 and returned to his farm. Unfortunately, an economic crisis created many financial difficulties for the Baron, who had no other means of support, and he had to sell the Santa Genebra farm, dying just before it, on 1 October 1907.

== Legacy ==
The region in and around part of the Santa Genebra farm became a subdistrict of the city of Campinas, which was named in his honour (Barão Geraldo), and where the large campus of the State University of Campinas is now located. Part of the farm was purchased by the Oliveira family, who preserved some of the natural forest. In 1981 it was donated to the municipality of Campinas, and in 1985 became an area of relevant ecological interest named the Mata de Santa Genebra and jointly administered by the city and the Federal ICMBio agency.

== Bibliography ==
Smith, Warney. Barão Geraldo, A Luta pela Autonomia (1920-1980). Centro de Memória da Unicamp, 1996.
