= Paulínia Futebol Universitário =

Paulínia
- Full name: Paulínia Futebol Universitário
- Nicknames: PFC ("Paulínia Futebol Clube" abbreviated); Dinão (Big dinosaur); Time dos Gladiadores (Gladiators' Team) o Time da cidade ("The city's team")
- Founded: June 10, 2004
- Ground: Luís Perissinoto, Paulínia, Brazil
- Capacity: 10,070
- League: Campeonato Paulista da Segunda Divisão
- 2011: Campeonato Paulista da Série A3, 17th
Home colours	Away colours

Paulínia Futebol Universitário (formerly Paulínia Futebol Clube), or Paulínia as they are usually called, is a Brazilian football team from Paulínia in São Paulo, founded on June 10, 2004.

The club's home stadium is Luís Perissinoto, with a capacity of 10,070. They play in purple shirts, white shorts and socks.

== History ==
Paulínia was founded on June 10, 2004.

On January 1, 2008, Paulínia began its professional football activities.

== Winners ==
- Copa Paulista Sub-17: 2008
- Campeonato Paulista de Futebol - Sub-20: 2010

== Stadium ==
Paulínia's stadium is Estádio Municipal Luís Perissinoto, inaugurated in 2006, with a maximum capacity of 10,070 people.

== Rivalries ==
Paulínia FC have a rivalry mainly with Sumaré, SEV Hortolândia, Primavera and Capivariano. There is also rivalry with Clube Atlético Guaçuano, Inter de Limeira and Ponte Preta.

== Symbols and colors ==
Paulínia's mascot is a dinosaur, whose name is Dino Paulino, it was chosen in 2009, in a popular contest. The original colors of Paulínia were purple and white.

=== Nicknames ===
Paulínia Futebol Clube is sometimes called PFC, which is "Paulínia Futebol Clube" abbreviated. It is also called "Time dos Gladiadores" (Gladiator's Team), nickname given by a newspaper of the city of Paulínia, and too "o Time da cidade" (city's team).

== Ultras ==
- Torcida Uniformizada do Paulínia (TUP - Paulinia's Uniformed Torcida)
- Fúria Azul (Blue Fury)
