= Refinaria do Planalto Paulista =

Coordinates: 22°43′42″S 47°07′54″W

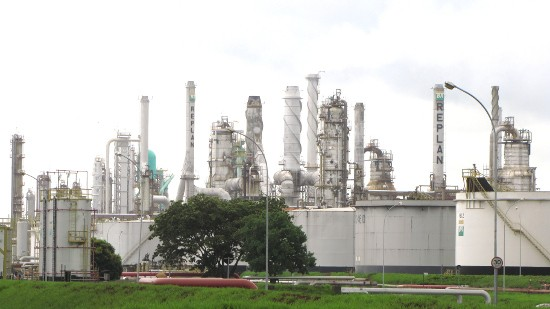
Refinery REPLAN, Paulínia-SP, Brazil.

Refinaria de Paulínia or simply REPLAN is a petroleum refinery located in the city of Paulínia in the São Paulo state, in Brazil. REPLAN is the largest refinery of the Brazilian company Petrobras, with a capacity of about 360,000 barrels per day (57,000 m^{3}/d), which accounts for about 20% of Brazilian overall petroleum refining capacity. About 80% of the processed petroleum is produced in Brazil, mostly from the Campos Basin.

== In popular culture ==
The REPLAN refinery was destroyed in the Tom Clancy novel Dead or Alive, by terrorists hoping to undermine a deal between the United States and Petrobras to ship oil to the United States at sub-OPEC prices.
