= Estádio Municipal Luís Perissinotto =

Sports stadium in Brazil

Coordinates: 22°45′40.12″S 47°09′15.86″W

Estádio Luiz Perissinotto
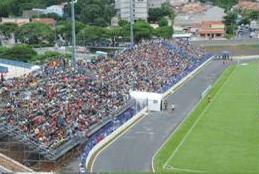
- Interactive map of Estádio Luiz Perissinotto
- Full name: Estádio Municipal Luiz Perissinotto
- Location: Paulínia, Brazil
- Owner: Paulínia City Hall
- Capacity: 10,070
- Surface: Natural grass
- Field size: 105 by 68 metres (114.8 yd × 74.4 yd)

Tenants
- Paulínia Futebol Clube; Sporting Club Paulinense

Estádio Municipal Luiz Perissinotto, usually known as Estádio Luiz Perissinotto or, sometimes by its nicknames Bermudas and Municipal, is a multi-use stadium in Paulínia, Brazil. It is currently used mostly for football matches. The stadium has a capacity of 10,070 people. It was inaugurated on 2000 and extended in 2006.

The stadium is owned by the Paulínia City Hall, and it is the home stadium of Paulínia FU and Sporting CP.
