= Eldorado Institute =

Brazilian research institute

Instituto de Pesquisas Eldorado
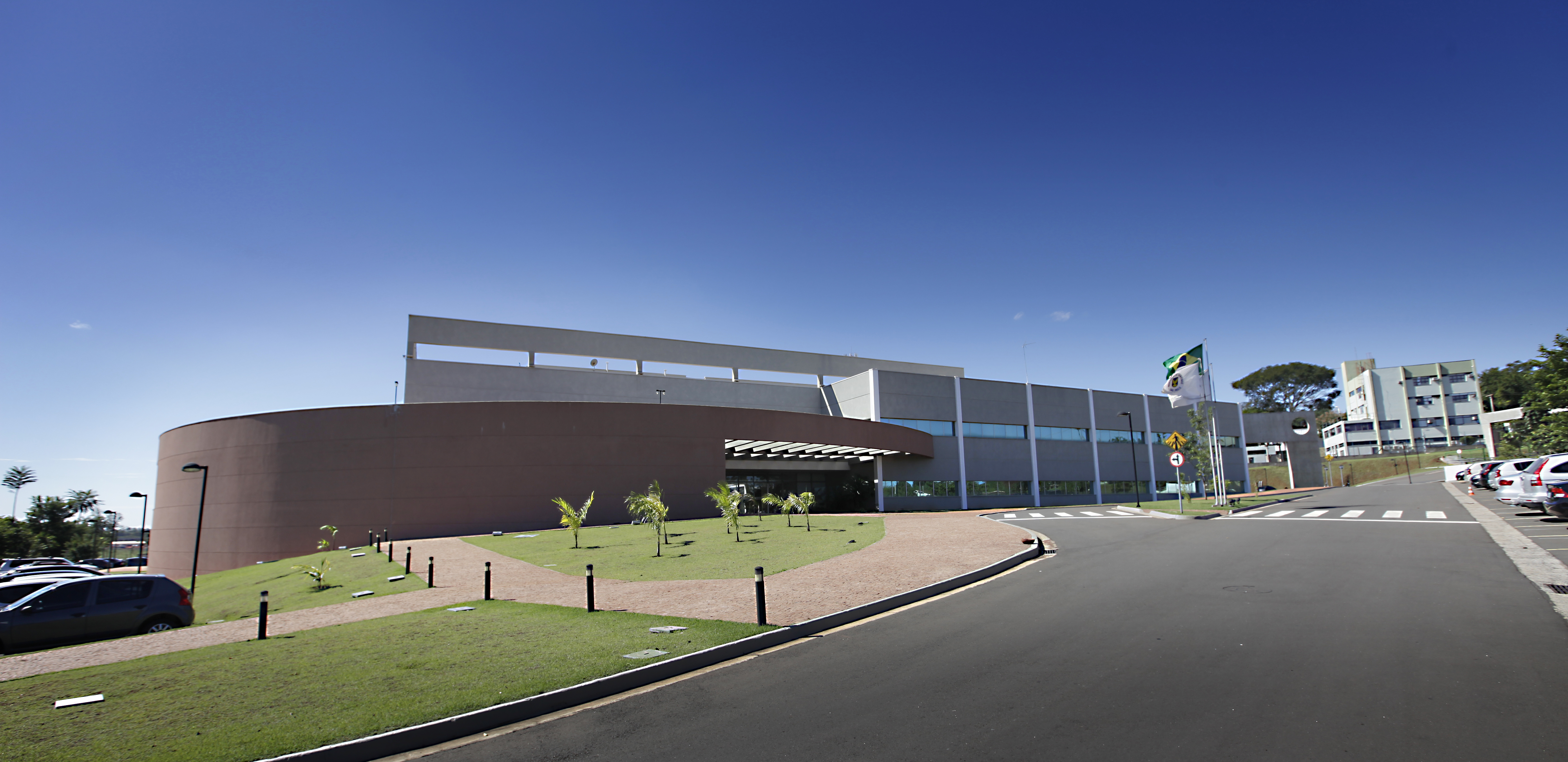
- The Eldorado Institute's headquarters in 2012
- Industry: Applied research
- Founded: 1999
- Headquarters: Campinas, São Paulo, Brazil
- Website: https://www.eldorado.org.br/

The Eldorado Research Institute (In Portuguese: Instituto de Pesquisas Eldorado) is a non-profit research, development and innovation institution with its headquarters located in Campinas, São Paulo, Brazil, in the high tech area known as Brazilian Silicon Valley. It has branches in Brasília, Porto Alegre and Manaus. It was founded in 1999.

== Activities and resources ==
The institute is active in research and development, project management, software engineering, product engineering, testing and qualification of software and hardware products and processes and training and education programs. For these purposes, it maintains several laboratories for testing, safety standards, acoustics, radio frequency, etc.

The institute has technological partnerships with companies such as Dell, Borland, Citrix, Intel, Microsoft, Motorola and IBM.
