= Heringer =

Heringer is a surname. Notable people with the surname include:

- Andrew Heringer (born 1984), American musician, singer-songwriter, composer, music-producer, theater collaborator and performer
- Anna Heringer (born 1977), German architect
- Victor Heringer (1988–2018) Brazilian novelist, translator, chronicler and poet
