= Barão Geraldo =

Coordinates: 22°49′40″S 47°04′47″W

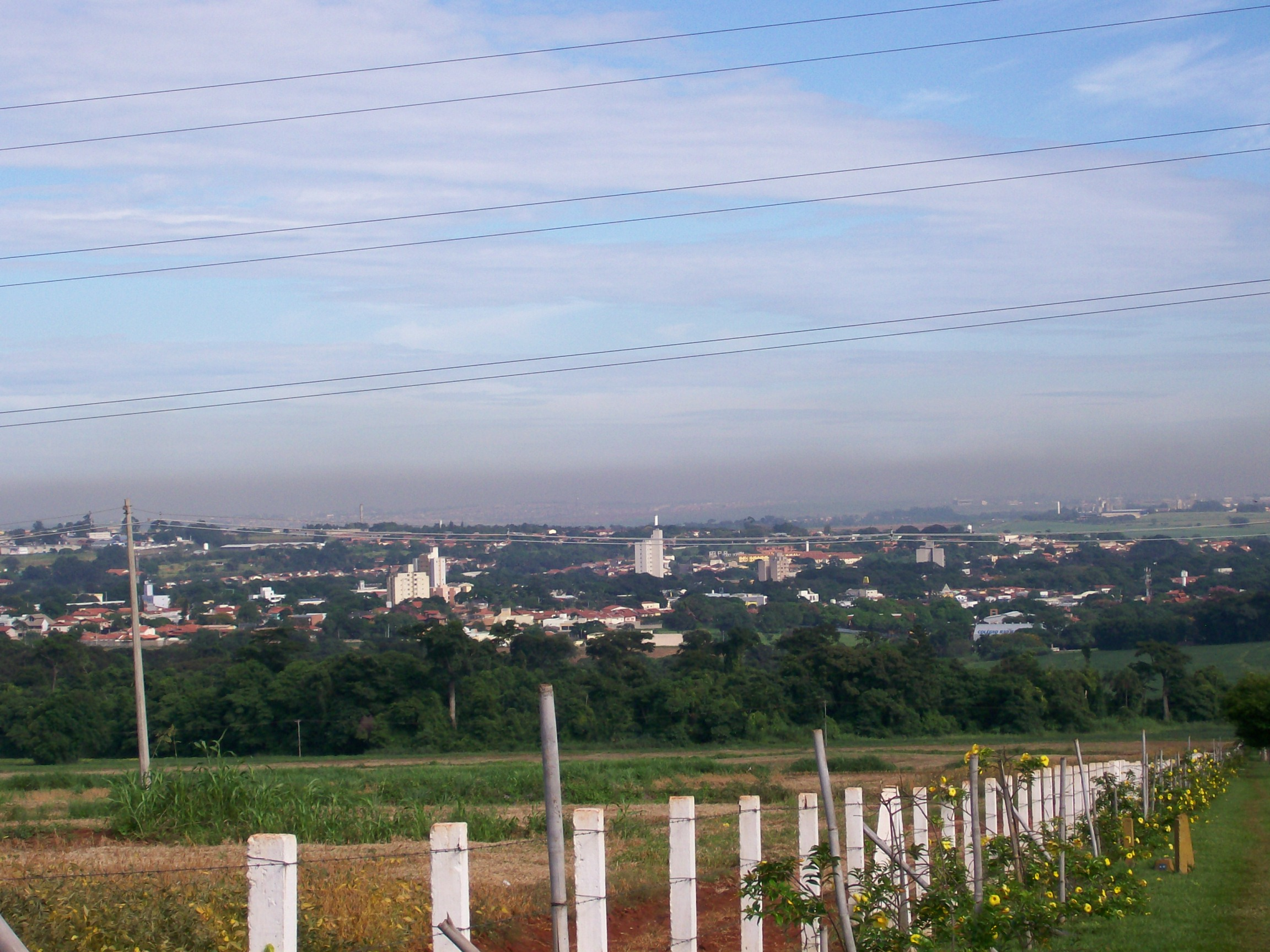
Panoramic view of Barão Geraldo, taken from a hill overlooking UNICAMP

Barão Geraldo (Portuguese pronunciation: [baˈɾɐ̃w ɡeˈɾawdu]) is a district of the municipality of Campinas, in the state of São Paulo, Brazil. It is named after Barão Geraldo de Rezende, a baron of the Empire of Brazil who owned a large farm in the region, in the 19th century.

Barão Geraldo is approximately 15 km (9.3 mi) from downtown Campinas and it is mainly connected to it via the Rodovia Campinas-Paulínia highway. Barão Geraldo is famous for hosting the main campus of the State University of Campinas (UNICAMP). The university campus is surrounded by typical suburban communities, the Cidade Universitária Campineira, so named because many professors and a large number of students reside there; as well as by gated condominiums, such as Rio das Pedras, Barao do Cafe and Santa Eudoxia, and many old farms, such as Pau D'Alho, Santa Eudóxia, Rio das Pedras and Santa Genebra. The university itself and the surrounding residential communities were built on a former coffee and sugarcane plantation.

Barão Geraldo is one of the greenest districts of Campinas. It has several lakes and the Mata of Santa Genebra, a large preservation area where the original rain forest which covered the region in the past can be seen and is studied by the university. It still has a large diversity of plants and animals, including capybaras and jaguars.

Near UNICAMP, the district hosts also a large high-tech industrial zone (with several companies, such as Nortel); three research and development institutions; the Centro de Pesquisa e Desenvolvimento em Telecomunicações (CPqD), in telecommunications and information technology; the Laboratório Nacional de Luz Síncrotron and the Eldorado Institute. It is considered the main part of the so-called Brazilian Silicon Valley. The expansion of its technological park has attracted other institutions, which are planned to settle in Barão Geraldo in the near future, such as the Technological Center of the Brazilian Army, the Research and Development Center of Natura cosmetics company and others.

Barão Geraldo is also a major health care destination in the state, with the large University Clinics Hospital, the Centro Médico de Campinas, the Centro Infantil Domingos A. Boldrini (a children's cancer hospital), and the Centro de Oncologia Campinas (a cancer treatment polyclinic).

The district has a sub-mayor and has about 45,000 inhabitants living in 70 sections.
