= Poços de Caldas =

- Municipality
- Municipality of Poços de Caldas
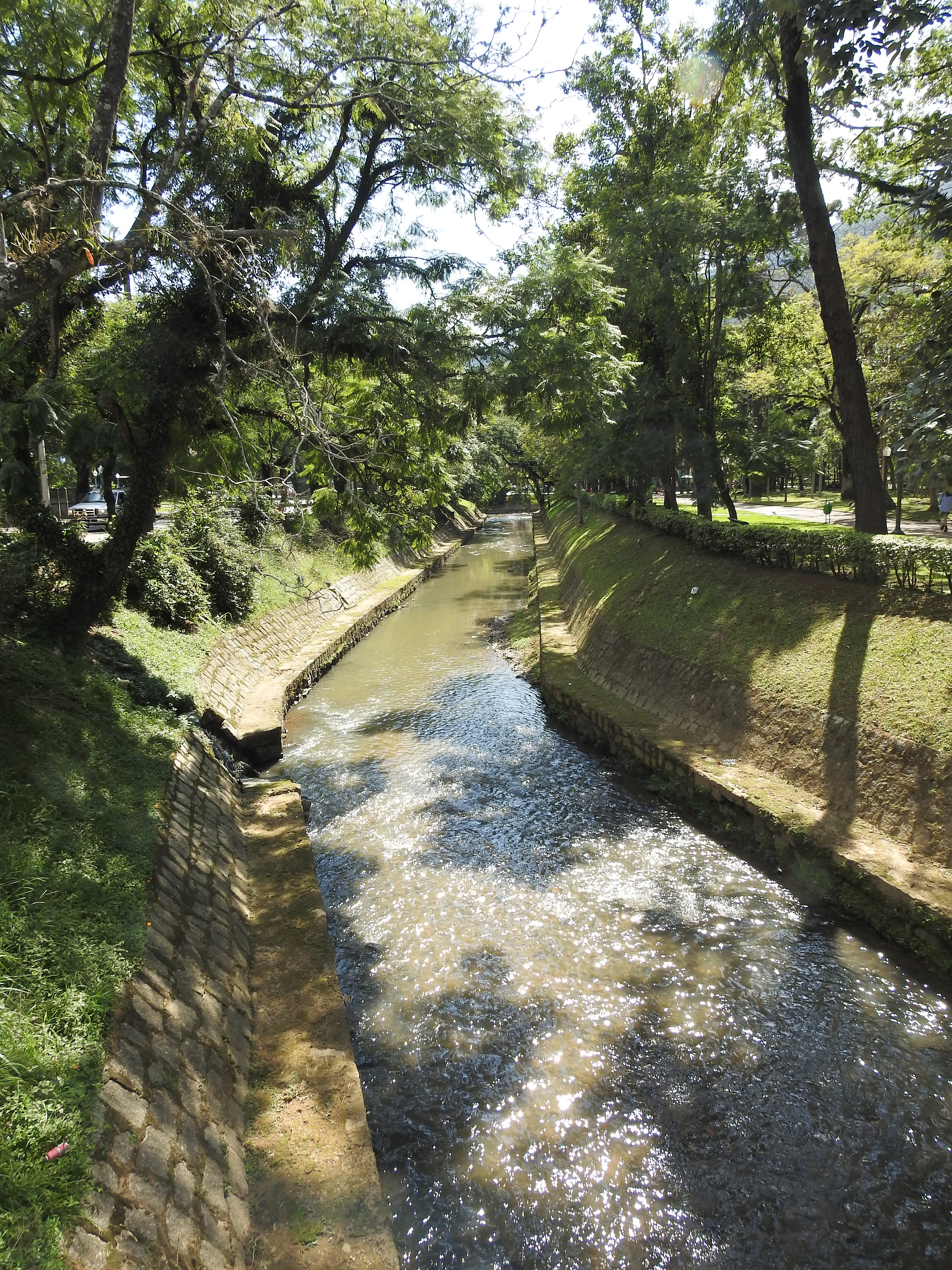
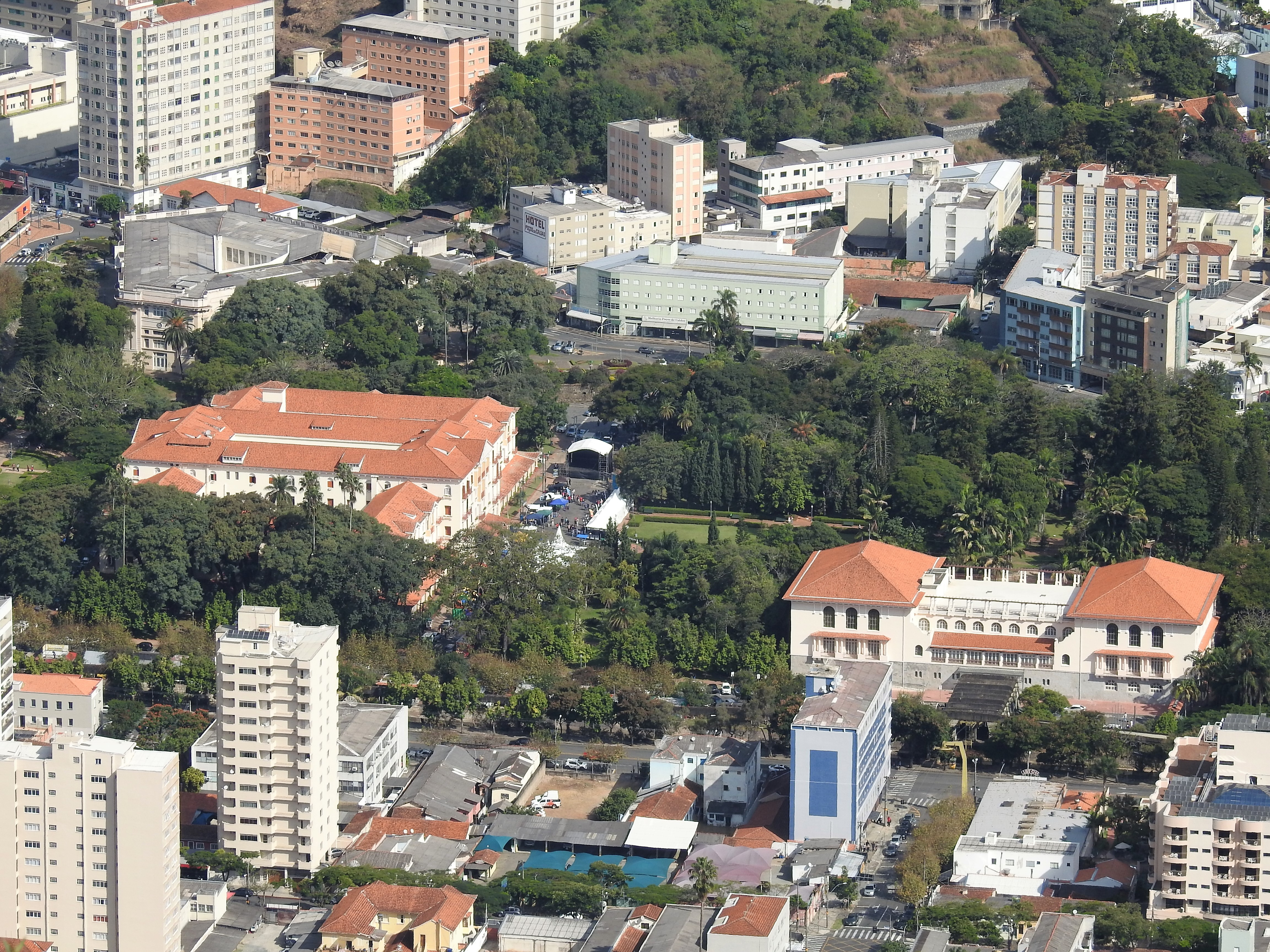
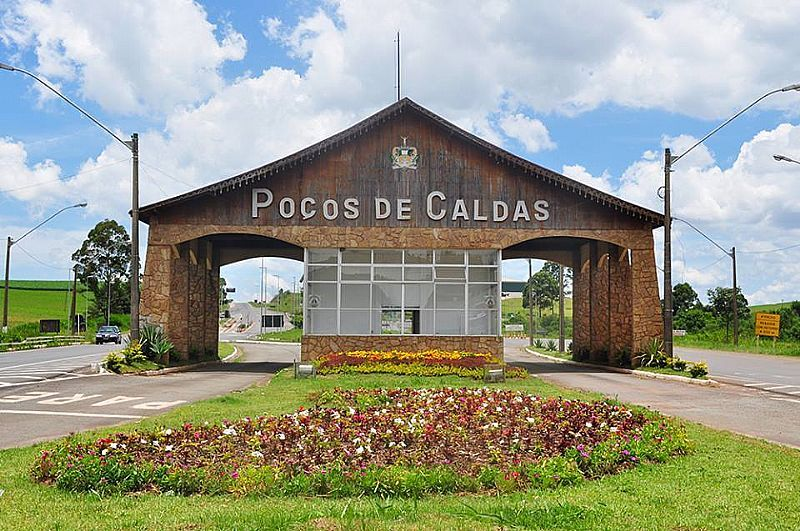
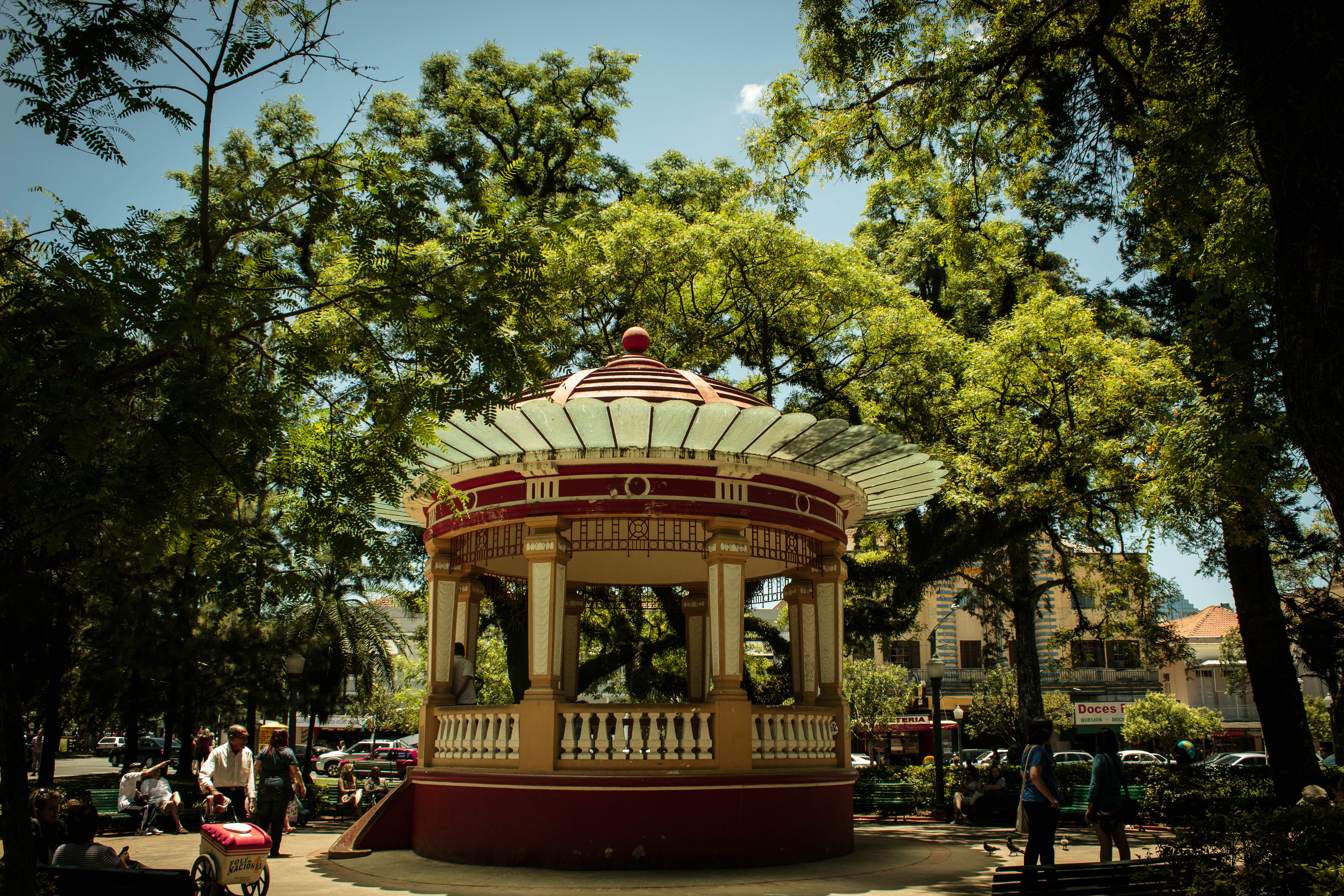
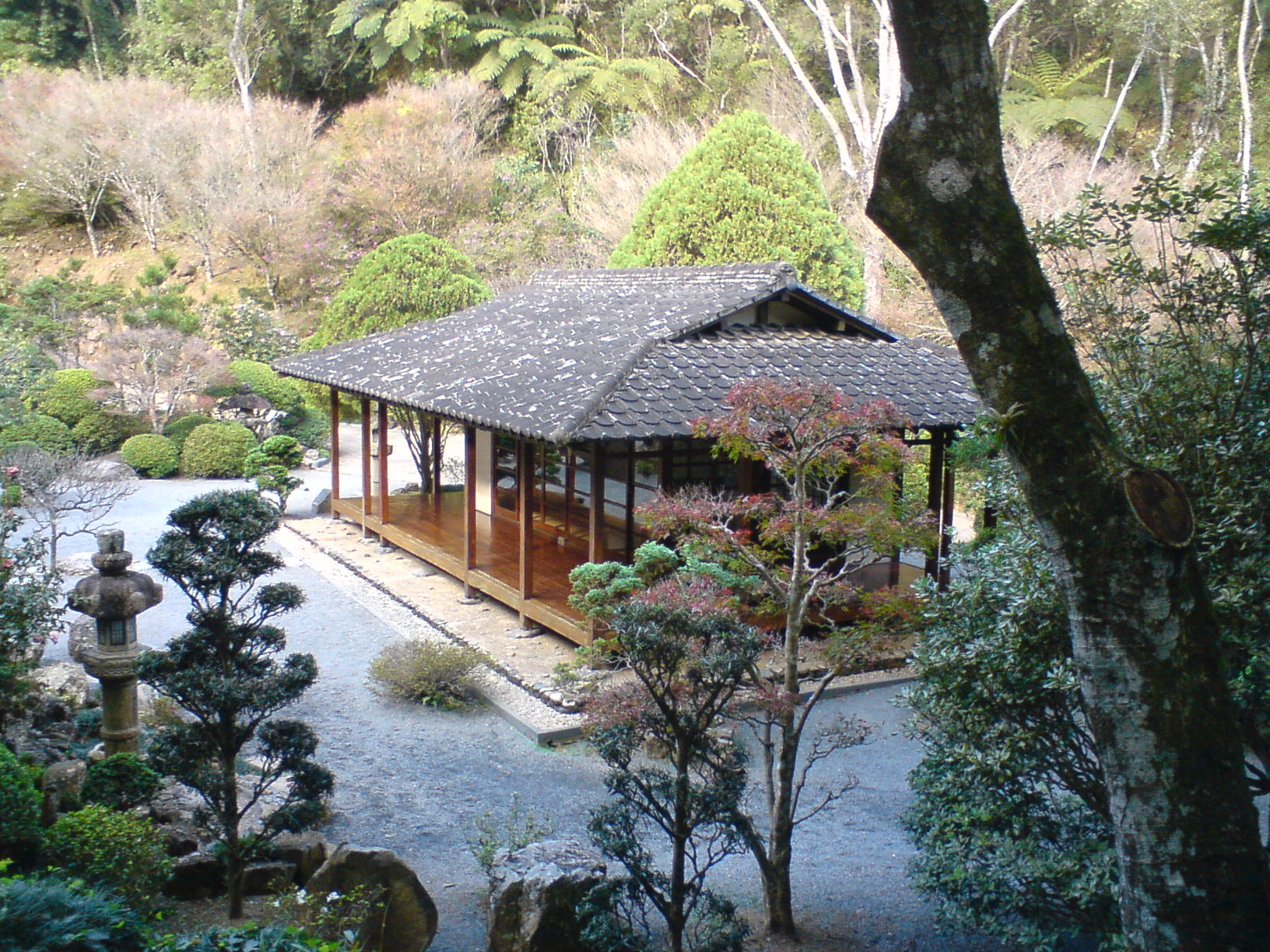
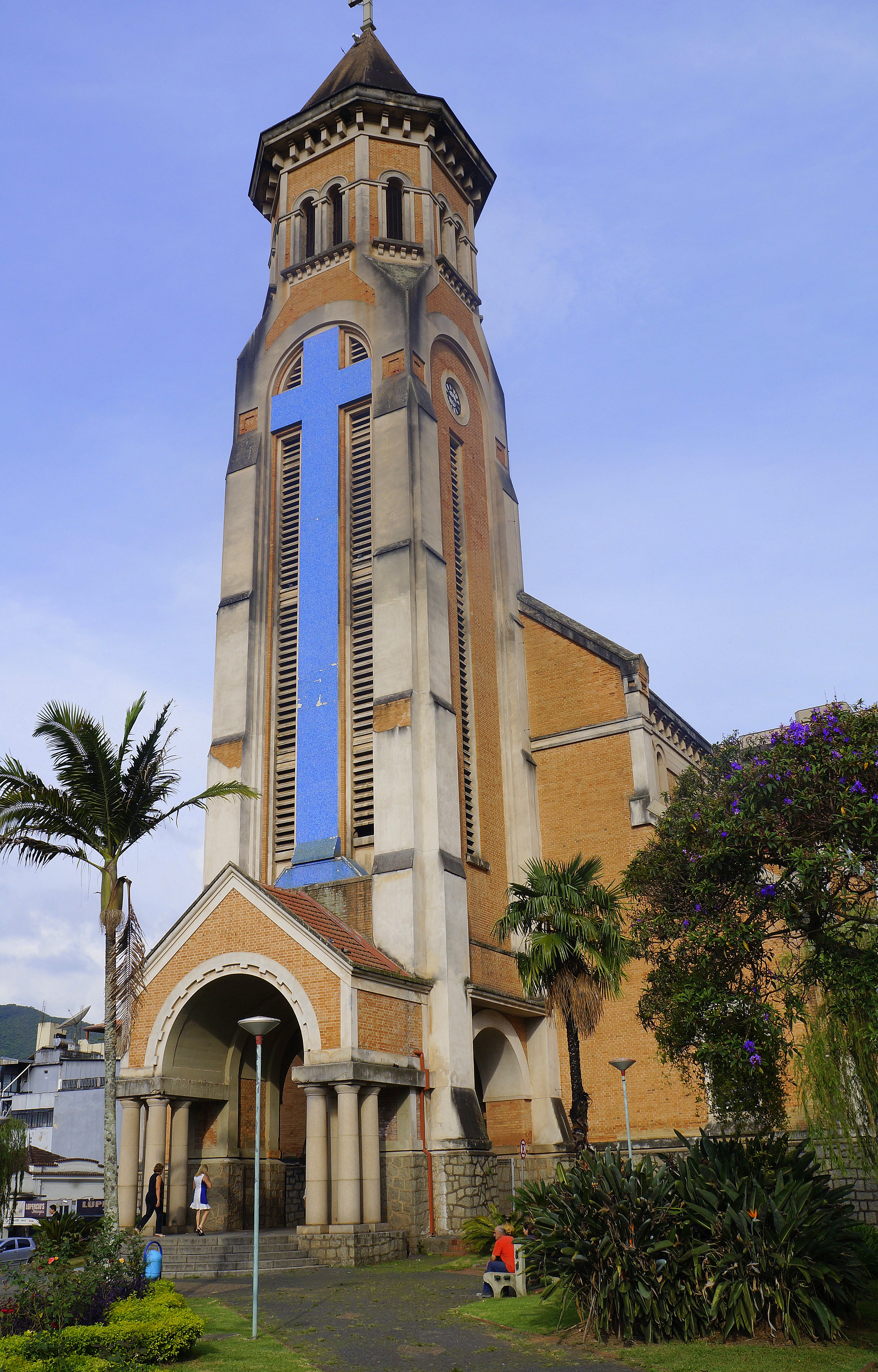
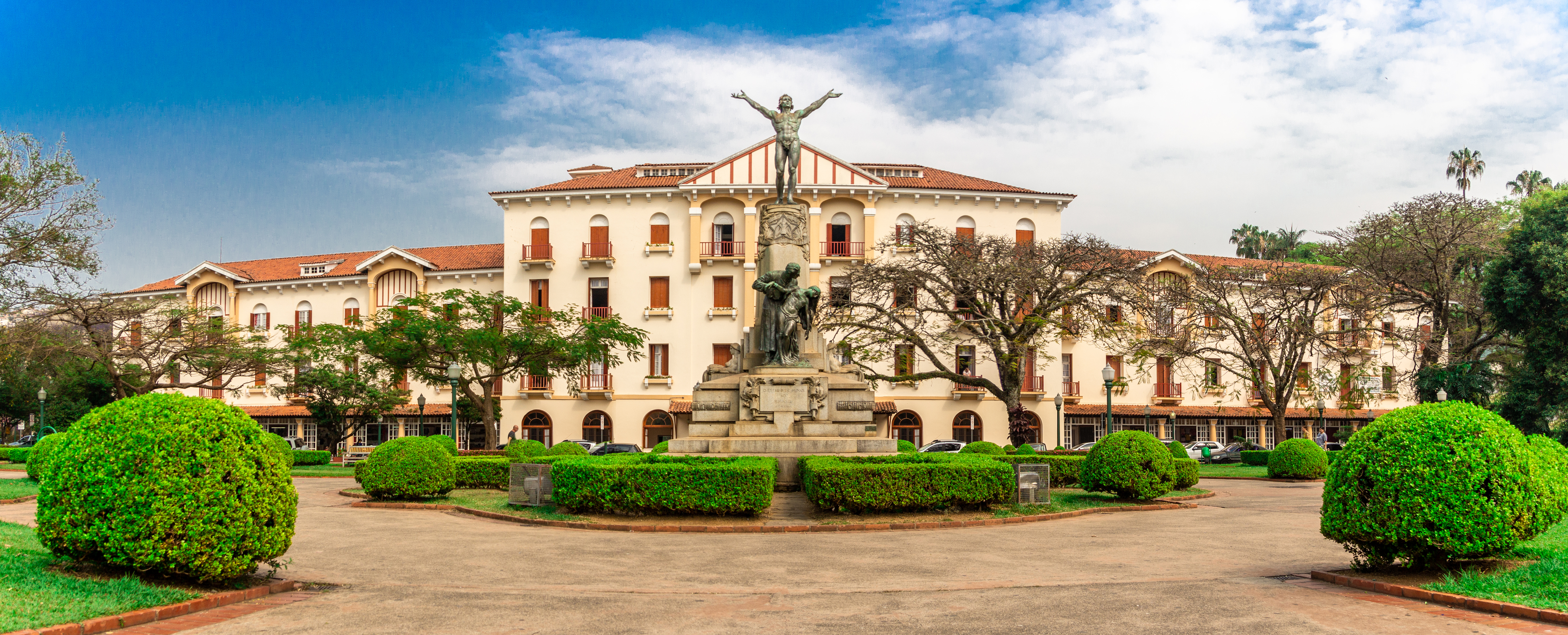

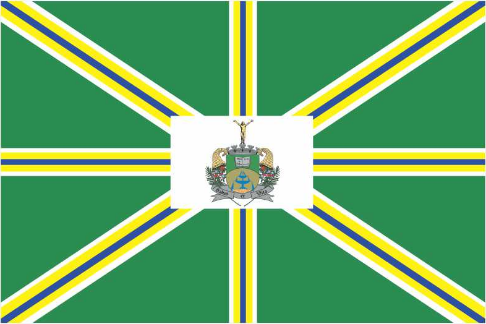
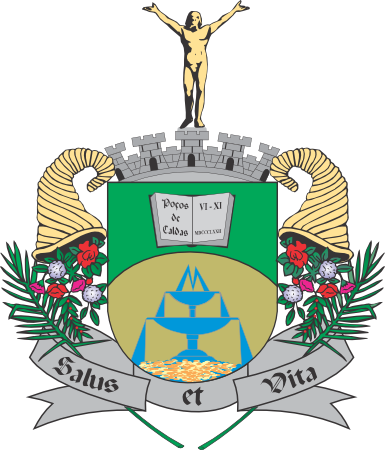
- Flag Coat of arms
- Nickname: Cidade das Rosas
- Location in Minas Gerais

- Location within Brazil
- Coordinates: 21°47′16″S 46°33′39″W
- Country: Brazil
- State: Minas Gerais
- Region: Southeast
- Intermediate Region: Pouso Alegre
- Immediate Region: Poços de Caldas
- Founded: 6 November 1872

Government
  - Mayor: Paulo Ney de Castro Jr. (PSDB)

Area
  - Municipality: 546.958 km^{2} (211.182 sq mi)
  - Urban: 85 km^{2} (33 sq mi)
- Elevation: 1,196 m (3,924 ft)

Population (2022 Census)
  - Municipality: 163,742
  - Estimate (2025): 172,339
  - Density: 299.369/km^{2} (775.361/sq mi)
- Time zone: UTC−3 (BRT)
- HDI (2010): 0.779 – high
- Website: pocosdecaldas.mg.gov.br

Poços de Caldas is a municipality in the south of Minas Gerais state, Brazil, in the microregion of the same name. Its estimated population in 2022 Census was 163,742 inhabitants. The city is known for its hot springs.

== History ==
Poços was founded in 1872. The region had been inhabited by the Cataguases Indians, who were expelled from their lands by the Bandeiras Unidas Paulistas during their quest for gold. The place was first called Freguesia de Nossa Senhora da Saúde das Águas de Caldas ("Parish of Our Lady of Health of Caldas Waters").

In 1874 it became a district, then, in 1875, it was elevated to the category of city. It became famous after the discovery of the hot springs, and many important people began to visit the spa in search of cures provided by the water.

The name comes from Caldas da Rainha, a spa town in central Portugal.

== Geography ==
It lies on the boundary of the state of São Paulo at 1186 meters elevation and is the main socio-economic nucleus of its region, having an area of 547 km^{2} (85 km^{2} urban and 459 km^{2} rural) in the municipality.

The physical area is made up for the most part of a high plateau formed by mountains, fields and valleys with an area of approximately 750 km^{2}. The average elevation is 1200 m (3937 ft), with Cristo Redentor, the highest point, at 1686 m (5531 ft). The topography is highly suggestive of a volcanic crater and, given that the region's rocks are indeed igneous and there are hot springs, this gave rise to a common misconception that Poços de Caldas would be located inside the crater of a large extinct volcano. In reality, Poços de Caldas is inside a caldera that was formed by the collapse of a central portion of terrain amid elevated areas, and while the latter have volcanic origin, the process that formed the supposed "crater" had nothing to do with volcanic activity.

Poços de Caldas occupies a highly strategic geographical location, due to its proximity to São Paulo (243 km), Belo Horizonte (460 km) and Rio de Janeiro (470 km), whose connections are made with good highways, and due to its integration into the routes of the hydro-mineral spas of Serra Negra, Águas de Lindóia, Socorro, Monte Alegre do Sul, Águas da Prata, Caldas (Pocinhos do Rio Verde), Cambuquira, Lambari, Caxambu and São Lourenço. Poços de Caldas is also close to the most developed regions of the interior of the state of São Paulo, such as Ribeirão Preto (240 km), Campinas (160 km) and São José dos Campos (315 km).

=== Climate ===
The climate is characterized by dry winters and mild summers. The winter is from April to September and has an average temperature of 15 °C and rainfall of 315 mm. The summer is from October to March and has an average temperature of 21 °C with rainfall of 1,430 mm. The annual rainfall is 1,745 mm. The average annual temperature is 17 °C with record low of -6 °C and record high of 31.7 °C.

Climate data for Poços de Caldas (1981–2010)
Month	Jan	Feb	Mar	Apr	May	Jun	Jul	Aug	Sep	Oct	Nov	Dec	Year
Mean daily maximum °C (°F)	26.4 (79.5)	26.6 (79.9)	26.5 (79.7)	25.5 (77.9)	23.2 (73.8)	22.5 (72.5)	22.8 (73.0)	24.6 (76.3)	25.4 (77.7)	26.3 (79.3)	26.2 (79.2)	25.9 (78.6)	25.2 (77.4)
Daily mean °C (°F)	20.9 (69.6)	21.0 (69.8)	20.6 (69.1)	18.8 (65.8)	15.8 (60.4)	13.8 (56.8)	14.0 (57.2)	15.5 (59.9)	17.8 (64.0)	19.5 (67.1)	20.1 (68.2)	20.4 (68.7)	18.2 (64.8)
Mean daily minimum °C (°F)	16.7 (62.1)	16.5 (61.7)	15.9 (60.6)	13.1 (55.6)	9.3 (48.7)	6.7 (44.1)	6.4 (43.5)	7.4 (45.3)	11.2 (52.2)	13.7 (56.7)	15.1 (59.2)	16.1 (61.0)	12.3 (54.1)
Average precipitation mm (inches)	295.3 (11.63)	224.6 (8.84)	187.1 (7.37)	77.9 (3.07)	67.0 (2.64)	23.8 (0.94)	19.9 (0.78)	29.4 (1.16)	78.9 (3.11)	136.3 (5.37)	174.6 (6.87)	287.3 (11.31)	1,602.1 (63.07)
Average precipitation days (≥ 1.0 mm)	18	15	14	8	6	3	2	4	7	10	13	18	118
Average relative humidity (%)	81.3	81.1	80.3	78.2	78.6	77.2	73.7	68.9	70.6	74.5	77.2	80.7	76.9
Mean monthly sunshine hours	120.9	128.0	141.2	183.5	186.7	190.2	196.6	216.2	150.7	150.1	141.8	129.6	1,935.5
Source: Instituto Nacional de Meteorologia

== Economy ==
Known principally for its thermal baths, there are several resorts in the city. Due to its wealth in hydro-mineral resources, Poços de Caldas is also known for the quality of the soap that it produces. There are four factories in the city: Raízes, Antares, Sarandi and Terra Brasil. Poços is famous for its glass, which is known internationally. The founders of the factories were descendants of the artistic glassmakers who lived on the Island of Murano, near Venice, in Italy. In the city there are four glass factories: Ca'D'oro, São Marcos, Veneza and Bonora.

The local soils are rich in minerals that yield thorium and zirconium. One rare zirconium ore, caldasite, was named for the area. The city has Brazil's first uranium-ore concentration plant, for use in the Angra Nuclear Power Plant in Angra dos Reis.

Poços is also the home of one of the largest bauxite mines in the world, owned by Alcoa. Bauxite is an ore that contains at least 45% alumina, which is extracted to make aluminum. The smelting operations at Poços de Caldas have an annual capacity of 90,000 tons/year of primary aluminum. The facility is the largest aluminum-powder production facility in Latin America, and the second largest in the world.

The plant has a capacity of 14,000 tonnes/year of aluminum powder and meets the market demand for ferroalloys, refractories, pigments, metallurgy, chemicals, explosives and solid fuel for rockets. The facility began production of hydrated aluminas and hard-burned calcined aluminas in 1985.

The city gets most of its electricity from hydroelectric power plants, built and administrated with local resources (Departamento Municipal de Eletricidade), leading to independence from the state's power system.

== Tourism ==
The city has parks, squares, gardens, and São Domingos mountain, which has trails for walking. The sulphurous water is the main attraction and can be consumed in several fountains and at Thermas Antônio Carlos. There is an aerial tram to get to the Statue of Christ the Redeemer (1,686 m).

At the top of the mountain there is a great view of the nearby mountains. The city also offers options such as a Japanese tea garden, a theme park, museums, theaters, and other cultural events, including the yearly Music in the Mountains Festival (Festival Musica nas Montanhas).

The city is served by Emb. Walther Moreira Salles Airport.

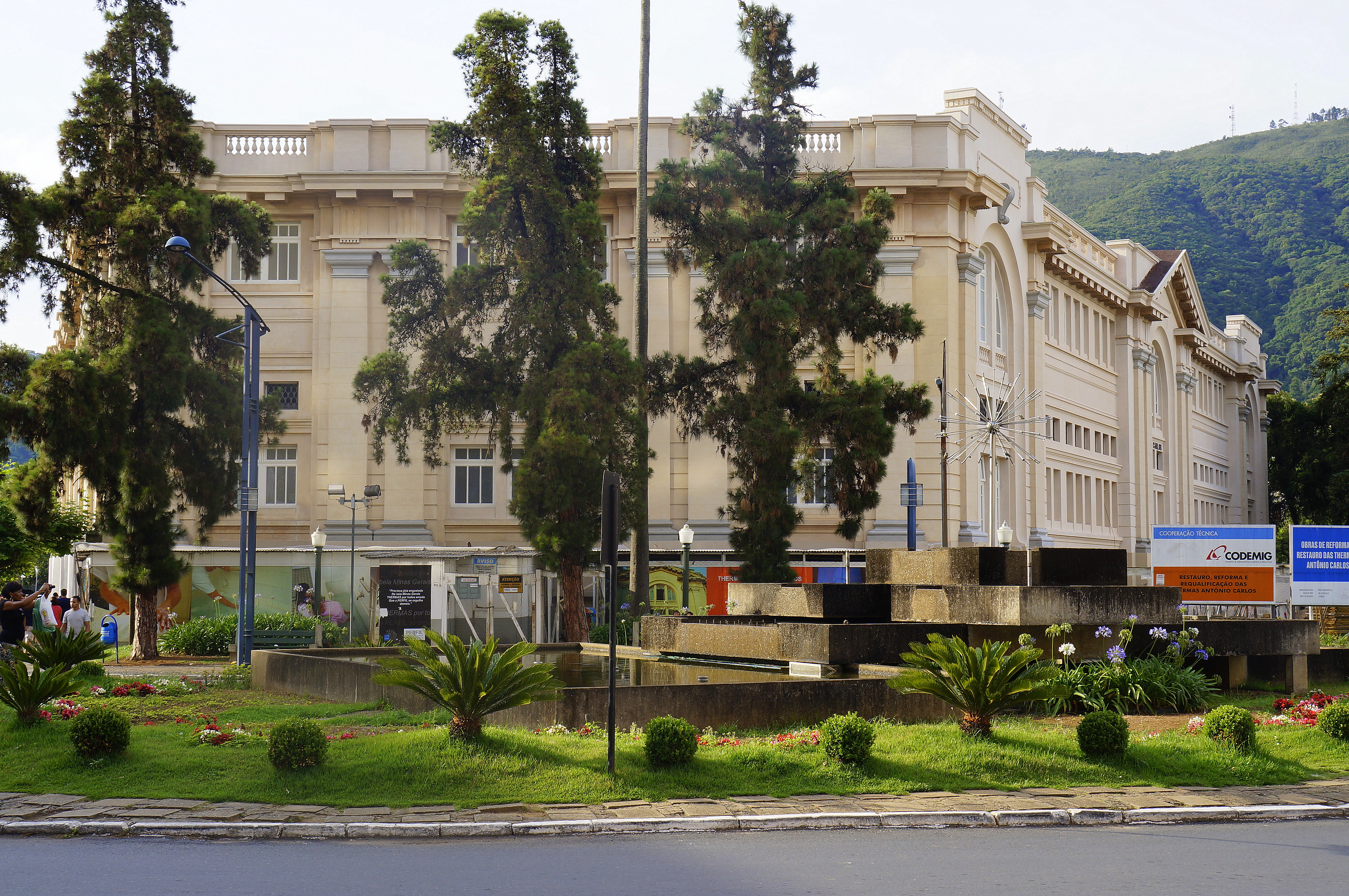
Antônio Carlos Spa

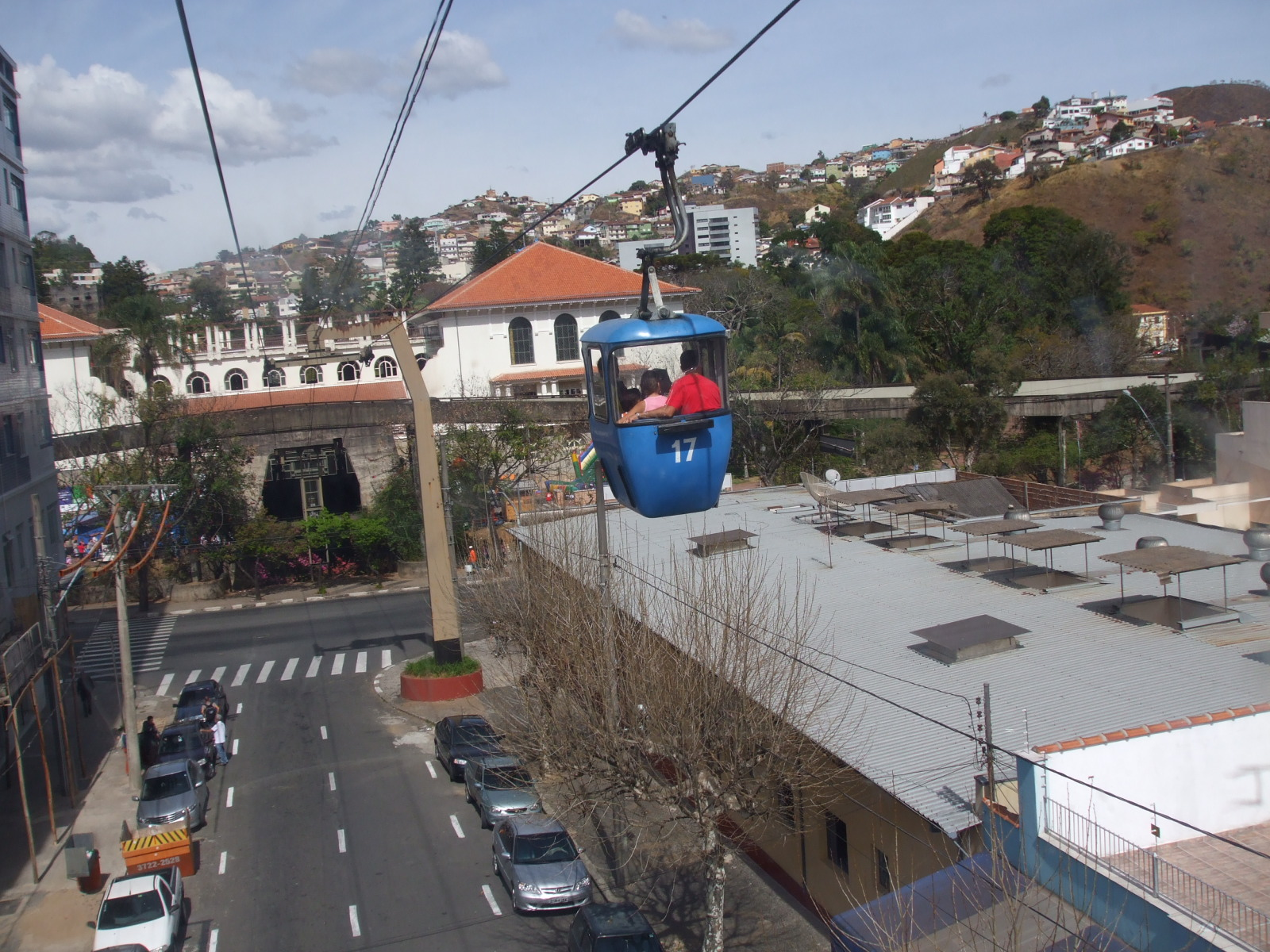
Cable car and Palace Casino

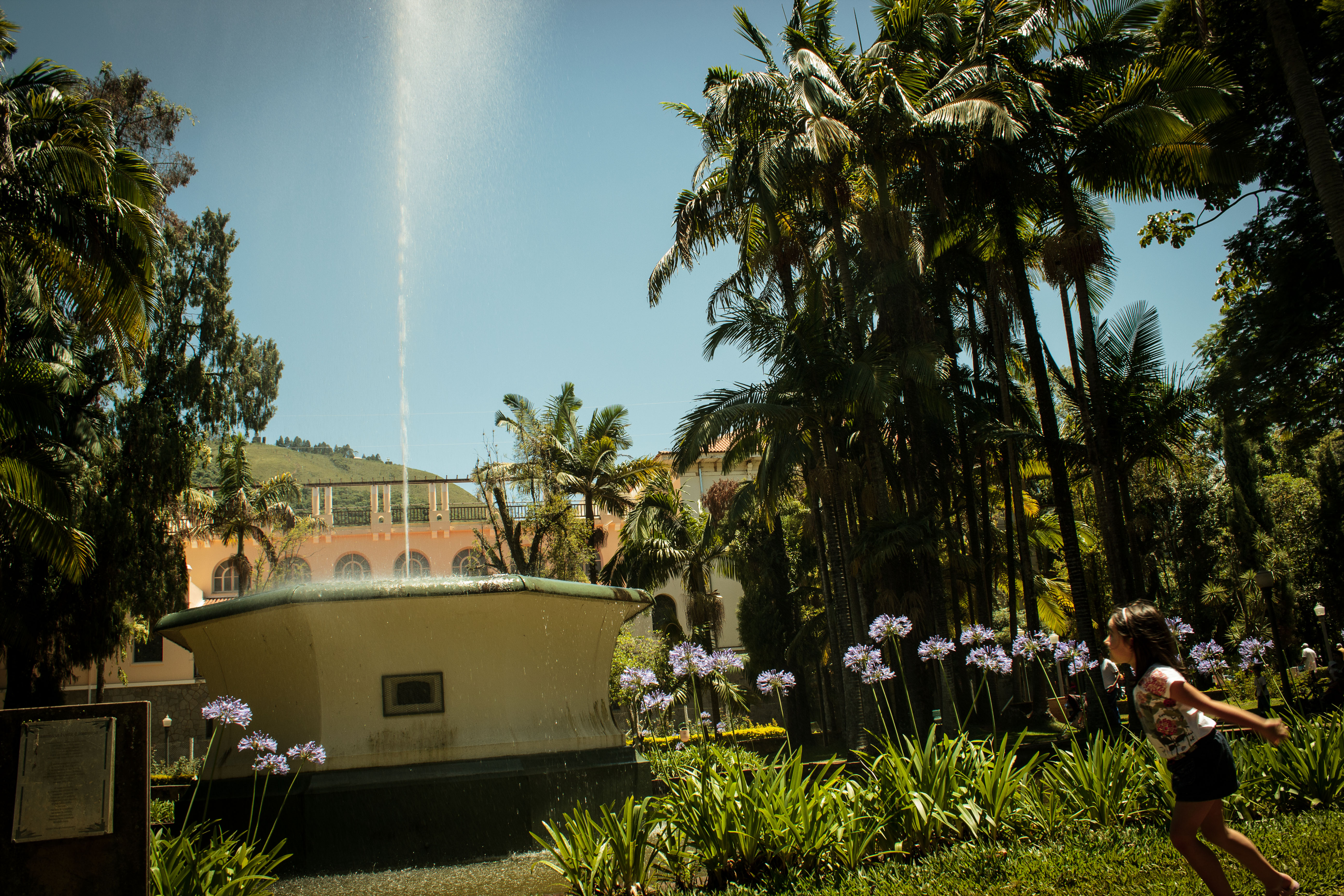
Luminous fountain

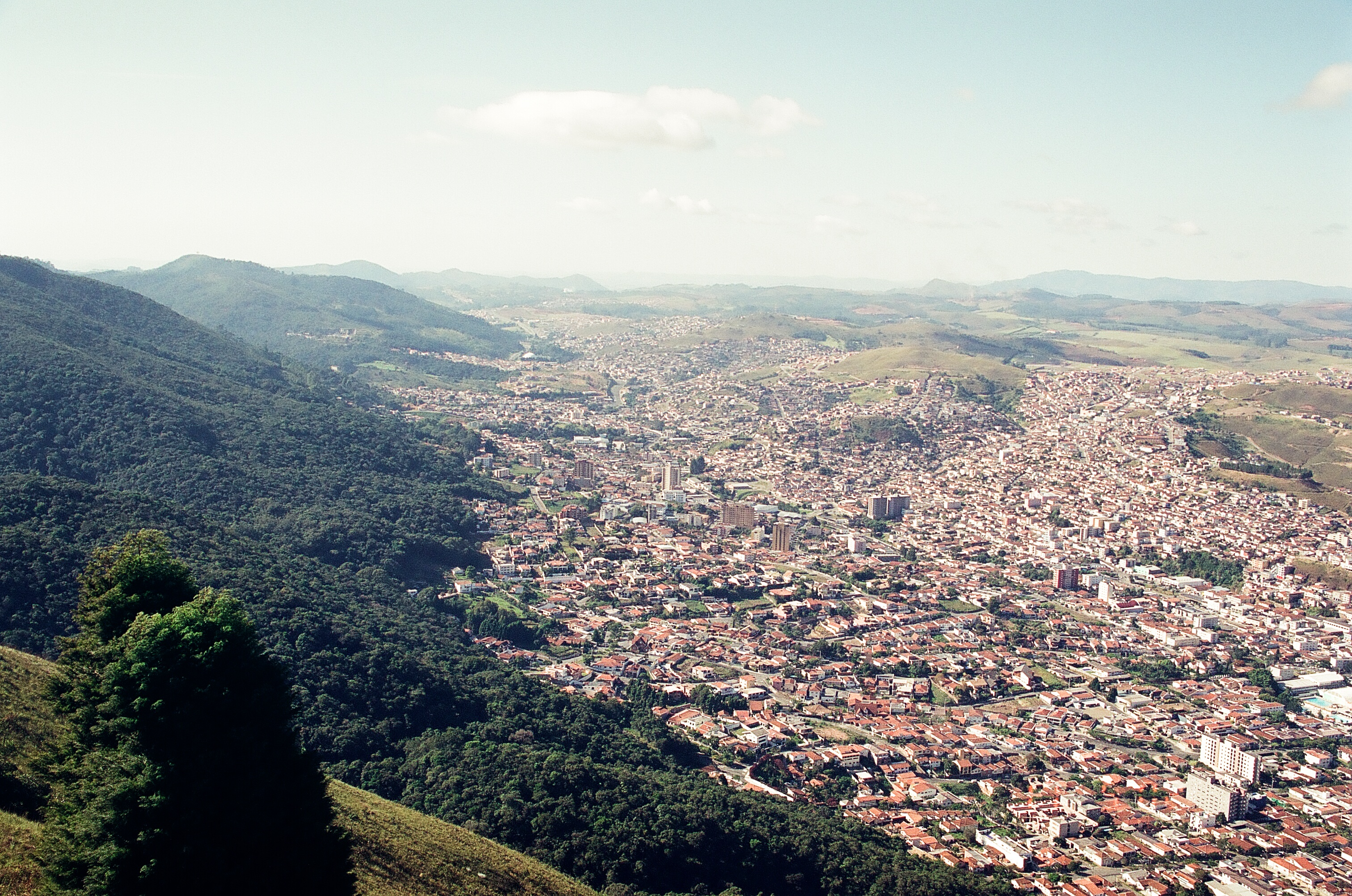
The region of the volcanic caldera inactive 90 million years ago

== Notable people ==
- Mauro Ramos de Oliveira, 1958 and 1962 FIFA World Cup champion with Brazil National Football Team
- Xandó (born c. 1961), Brazilian volleyball player, Olympic runner-up

== Sister cities ==
Poços de Caldas is twinned with:

- Takasaki, Japan (1968)
- Jundiaí, Brazil (1991)
- Caldas da Rainha, Portugal (2001)
- General Pueyrredón, Argentina (2009)
- São Luís, Brazil (2011)
- São João del-Rei, Brazil (2012)
- Bagé, Brazil (2014)
- Mount Vernon, United States (2014)

== See also ==
- List of municipalities in Minas Gerais
