= Antoninho (footballer, born 1939) =

Brazilian footballer (1939–2021)

Personal information
- Full name: Benedicto Antonio Angeli
- Date of birth: 10 February 1939
- Place of birth: Lindóia, Brazil
- Date of death: 3 June 2021 (aged 82)
- Place of death: Ribeirão Preto, Brazil
- Height: 1.73 m (5 ft 8 in)
- Position: Forward

Senior career*
Years	Team	Apps	(Gls)
1956–1959	Palmeiras	82	(15)
1959–1960	Botafogo-SP		
1960–1961	Fiorentina		
1962–1968	Botafogo-SP	188	(83)
1969	América-SP		
1970	Comercial		
1971–1972	Sertãozinho		

Managerial career
- 1978–1981: Botafogo-SP
- 1982: América-SP
- 1983: Uberaba
- 1984: Comercial
- 1985–1986: Francana
- 1989–1991: Sertãozinho
- 1995: Kashiwa Reysol
- 1999–2000: Botafogo-SP
- 2004: Shimizu S-Pulse
- * Club domestic league appearances and goals

Benedicto Antonio Angeli (10 February 1939 – 3 June 2021), known as Antoninho, was a former Brazilian football manager.

== Death ==
Antoninho died on 3 June 2021, due to a lung infection caused by COVID-19.

== Managerial statistics ==
Team	From	To	Record				
Team	From	To	G	W	D	L	Win %
Kashiwa Reysol	1995	1995	26	14	0	12	53.85
Shimizu S-Pulse	2004	2004	15	3	7	5	20.00
Total			41	17	7	17	41.46

== Honours ==
Fiorentina

- Coppa Italia: 1960-61
- UEFA Cup Winners' Cup: 1960-61
