= Águas de Lindoia =

- Municipality
- Municipality of Águas de Lindoia
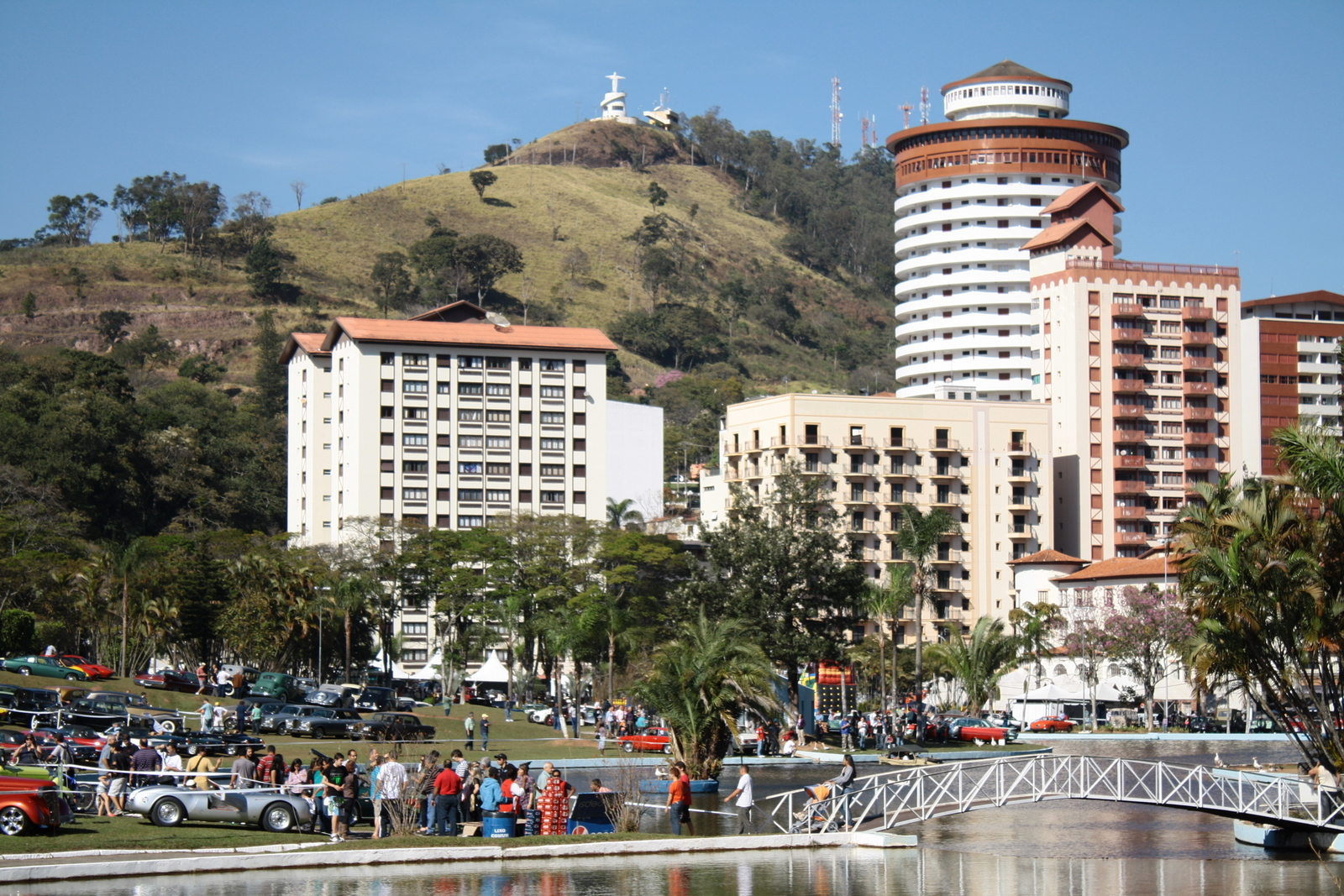
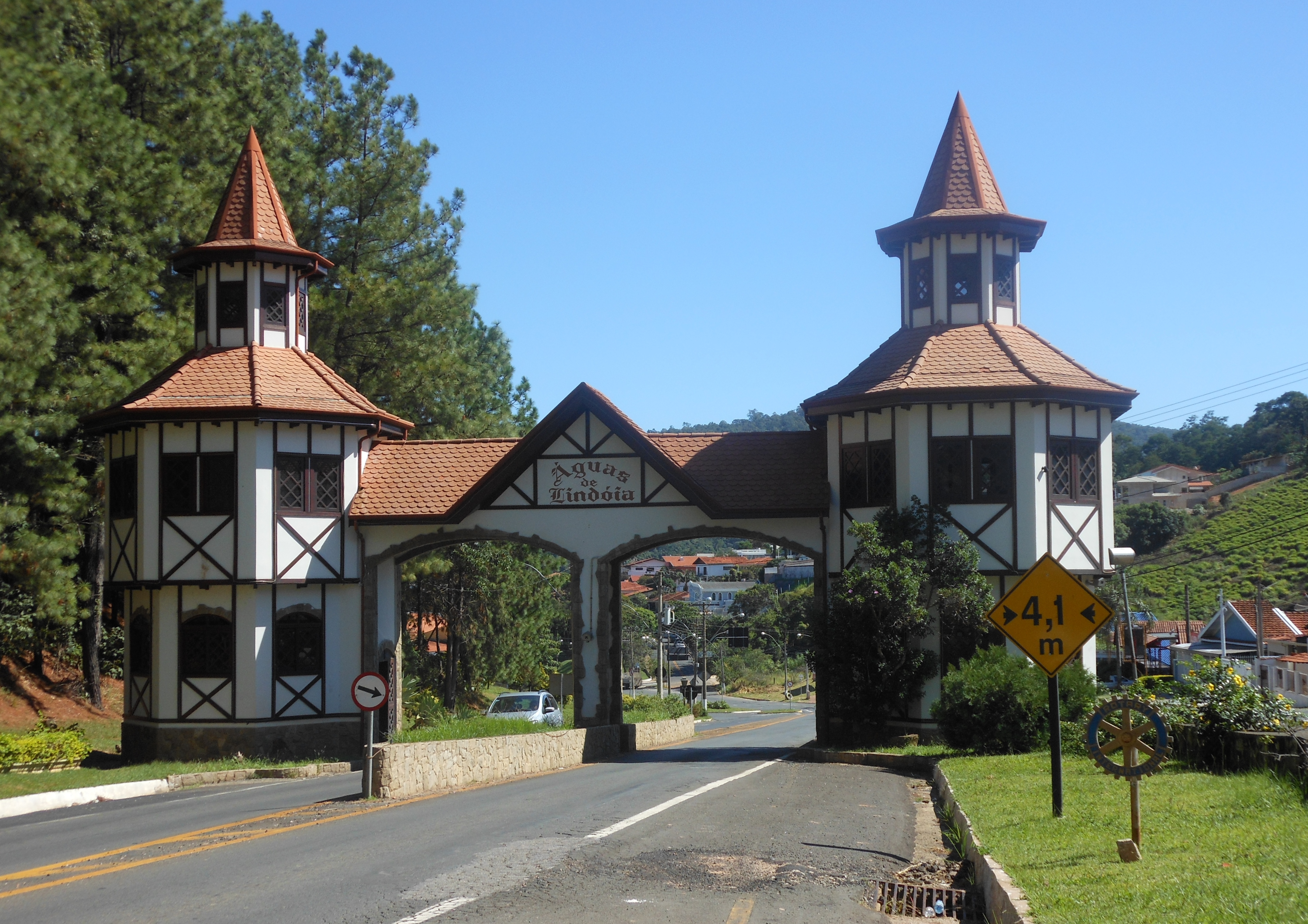
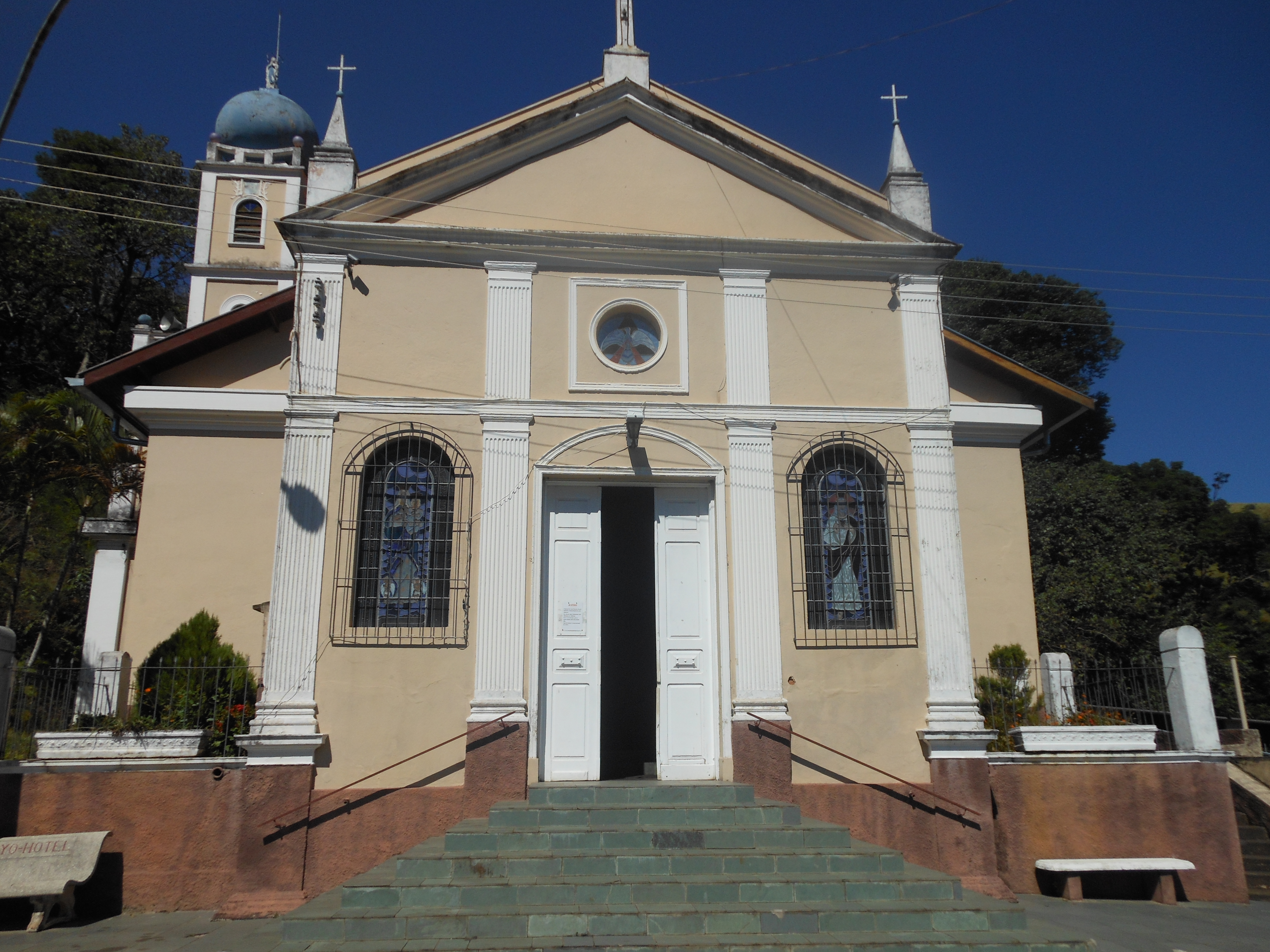
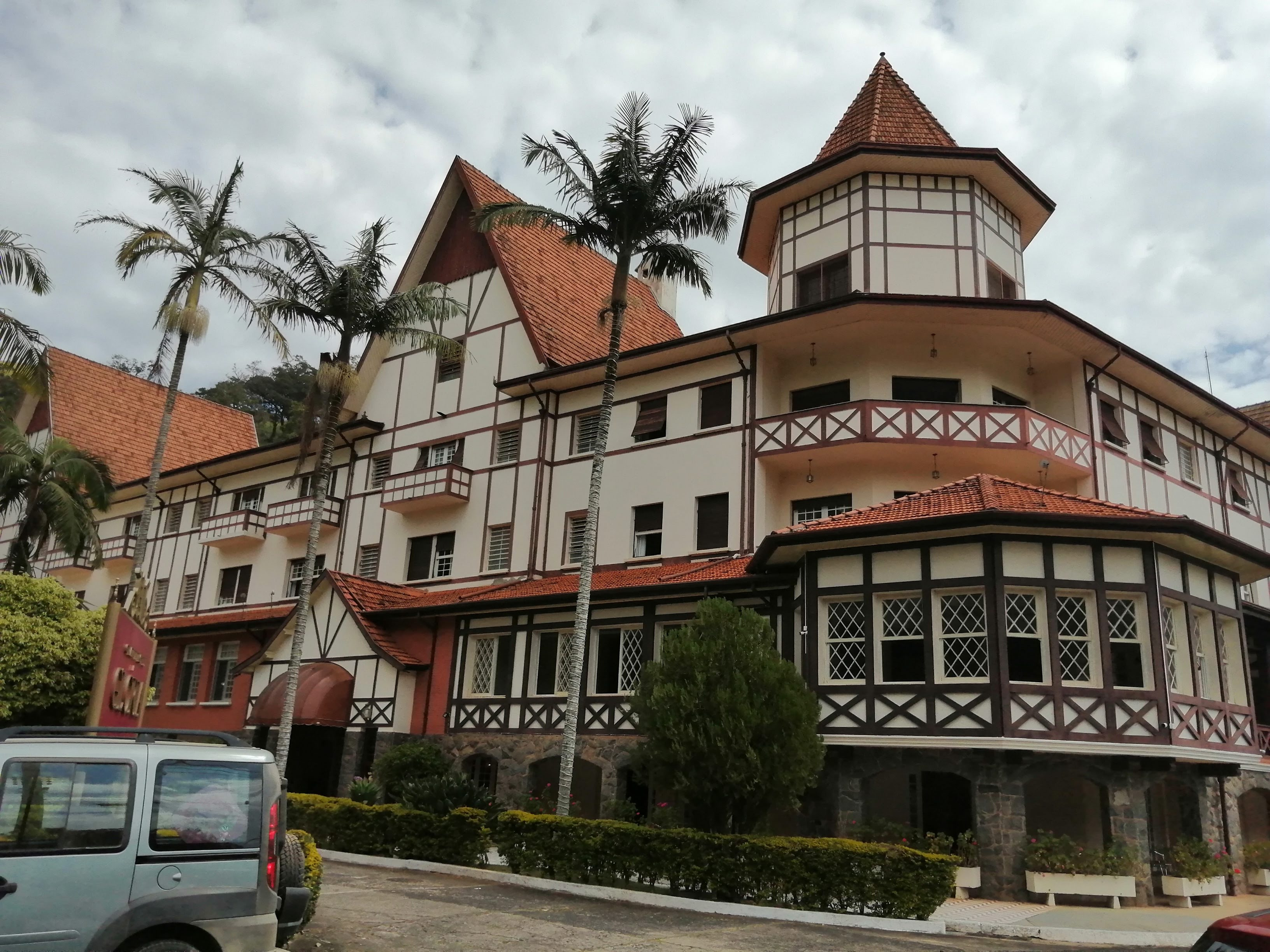
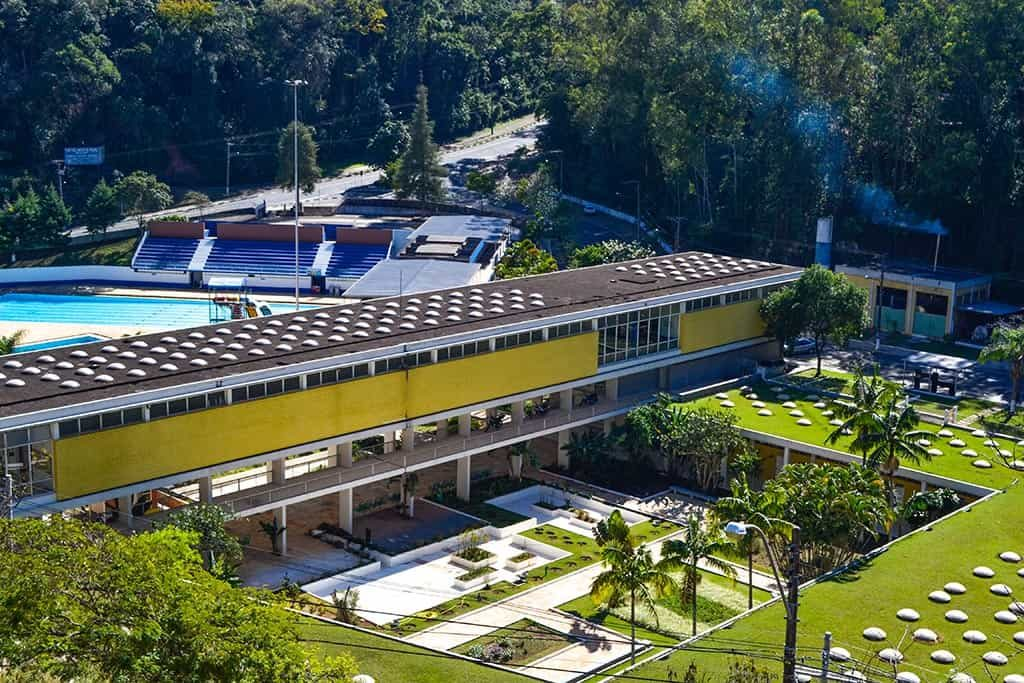
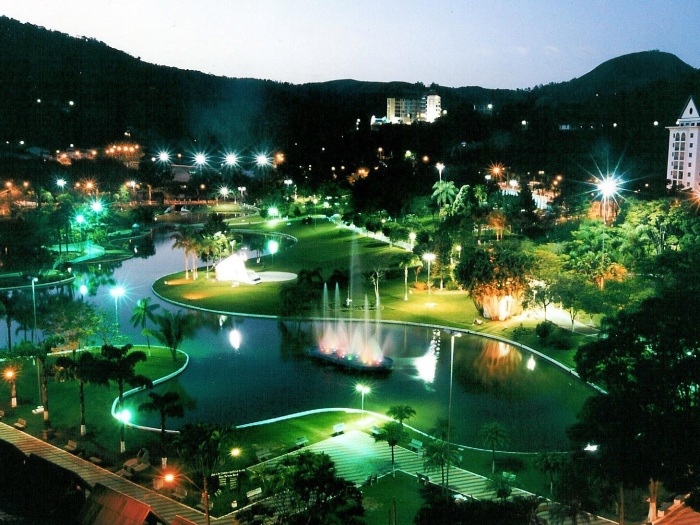
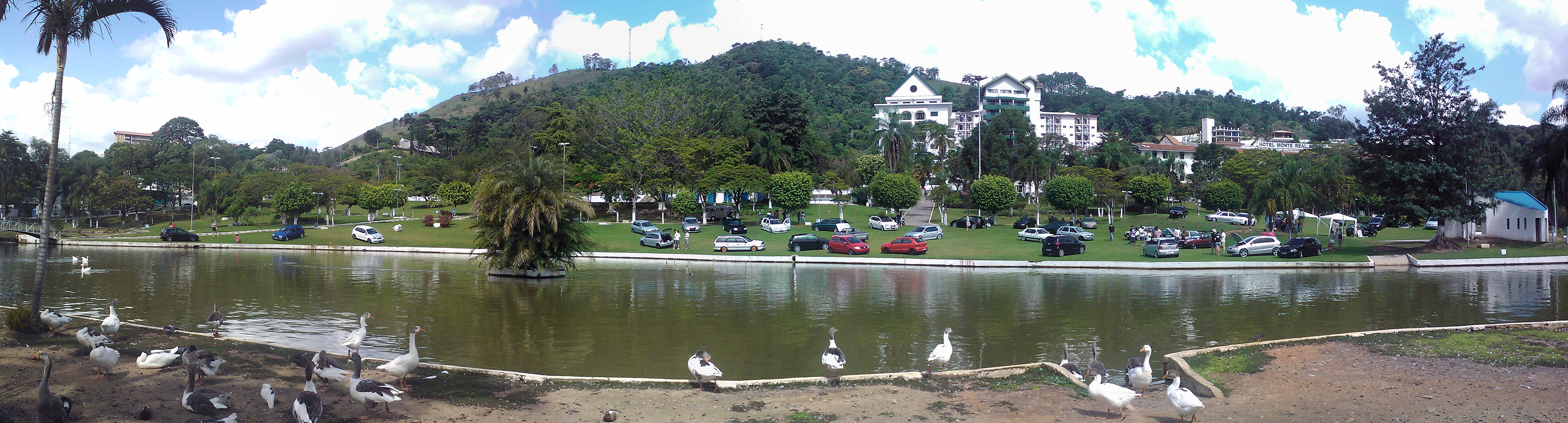

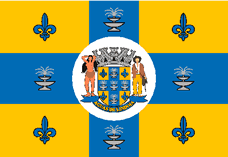
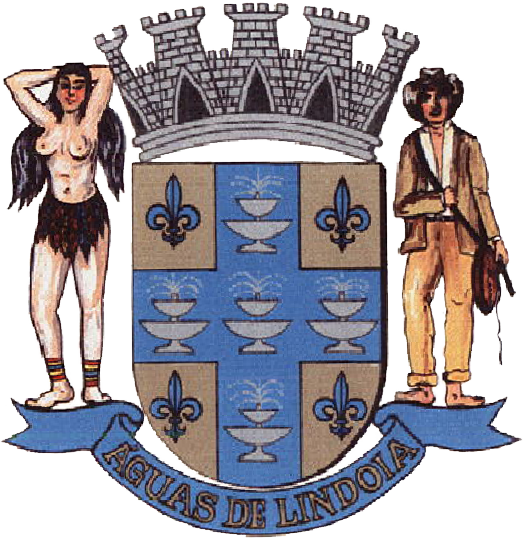
- Flag Coat of arms

- Location in São Paulo

- Location in Brazil
- Coordinates: 22°28′36″S 46°38′0″W
- Country: Brazil
- Region: Southeast
- State: São Paulo
- Founded: 16 November 1938

Government
  - Mayor: Gilberto Abdou Helou (PSDB)

Area
  - Total: 60.1 km^{2} (23.2 sq mi)
- Elevation: 945 m (3,100 ft)

Population (2020)
  - Total: 18,808
  - Density: 313/km^{2} (811/sq mi)
- Time zone: UTC−3 (BRT)
- HDI (2010): 0.745 – high

Águas de Lindoia (Lindoia Waters) is a Brazilian municipality of the state of São Paulo. The population is 18,808 (2020 est.) in an area of 60.1 km^{2}. It is a tourist spot in part due to its hot springs, being part of the Circuito das Águas, also including the cities of Amparo, Jaguariúna, Lindoia, Monte Alegre, Pedreira, Serra Negra and Socorro.

== History ==
Before the 20th-century, the location was only known by adventurers who crossed the woods searching for gold. Having contracted diseases during their journeys, these adventurers found the cure in the warm waters that flowed from the mountains.

In 1909, an Italian doctor, Francisco Tozzi, learned from his own father, Henrique Tozzi, about the medicinal properties of the springs. Dr Francisco Tozzi lived in Serra Negra, and ended up buying the region auctioned by the government, making the property a public space.

== Demographics ==
Historical population (municipality)
Year	Population	%±
1960	6,329	—
1970	6,732	6.4%
1980	9,161	36.1%
1991	11,966	30.6%
2000	16,190	35.3%
2010	17,266	6.6%
2022	17,930	3.8%

== Leisure and business ==
165 km from São Paulo City, Águas de Lindoia offers the hot springs, adventure sports, and agritourism. Its economy is based on tourism.

The city's population is 17,266 inhabitants. There are 1,500 apartments and 25 hotels with the capacity to host 5,000 guests per day, allowing it to host several large Congresses and conventions per year, some nearing in size to 4,000 participants.

== Media ==
In telecommunications, the city was served by Companhia Telefônica Brasileira until 1973, when it began to be served by Telecomunicações de São Paulo. In July 1998, this company was acquired by Telefónica, which adopted the Vivo brand in 2012.

The company is currently an operator of cell phones, fixed lines, internet (fiber optics/4G) and television (satellite and cable).

== Religion ==
Christianity is present in the city as follows:

=== Catholic Church ===
The Catholic church in the municipality is part of the Roman Catholic Diocese of Amparo.

=== Protestant Church ===
The most diverse evangelical beliefs are present in the city, mainly Pentecostal, including the Assemblies of God in Brazil (the largest evangelical church in the country), Christian Congregation in Brazil, among others. These denominations are growing more and more throughout Brazil.

== See also ==
- List of municipalities in São Paulo
- List of municipalities in the state of São Paulo by population
- Interior of São Paulo
