= Caldasite =

Uraniferous ore of zirconium

Caldasite Zircon-favas
Composition
- Primary: Zircon (ZrSiO_{4}), Baddeleyite (ZrO_{2})
- Secondary: Uranium (as triuranium octoxide [U_{2}O_{3}])

Caldasite (Portuguese: Caldasito, German: Zirkonglaskopf, Spanish: Caldasita) is a rare uraniferous ore of zirconium found in the Poços de Caldas massif, located in the states of Minas Gerais and São Paulo, Brazil.

It is most often found as a dark gray, very dense, hard rock. It also appears as a friable brown substance.

The massif is an alkaline complex, formed by a large intrusion during the mid-Cretaceous. The ore is a result of hydrothermal alteration of the nepheline-syenitic rocks; it has also been weathered out and concentrated in paleoplacer deposits.
