= Serra Negra =

- Municipality
- Municipality of the Hydromineral Spa of Serra Negra
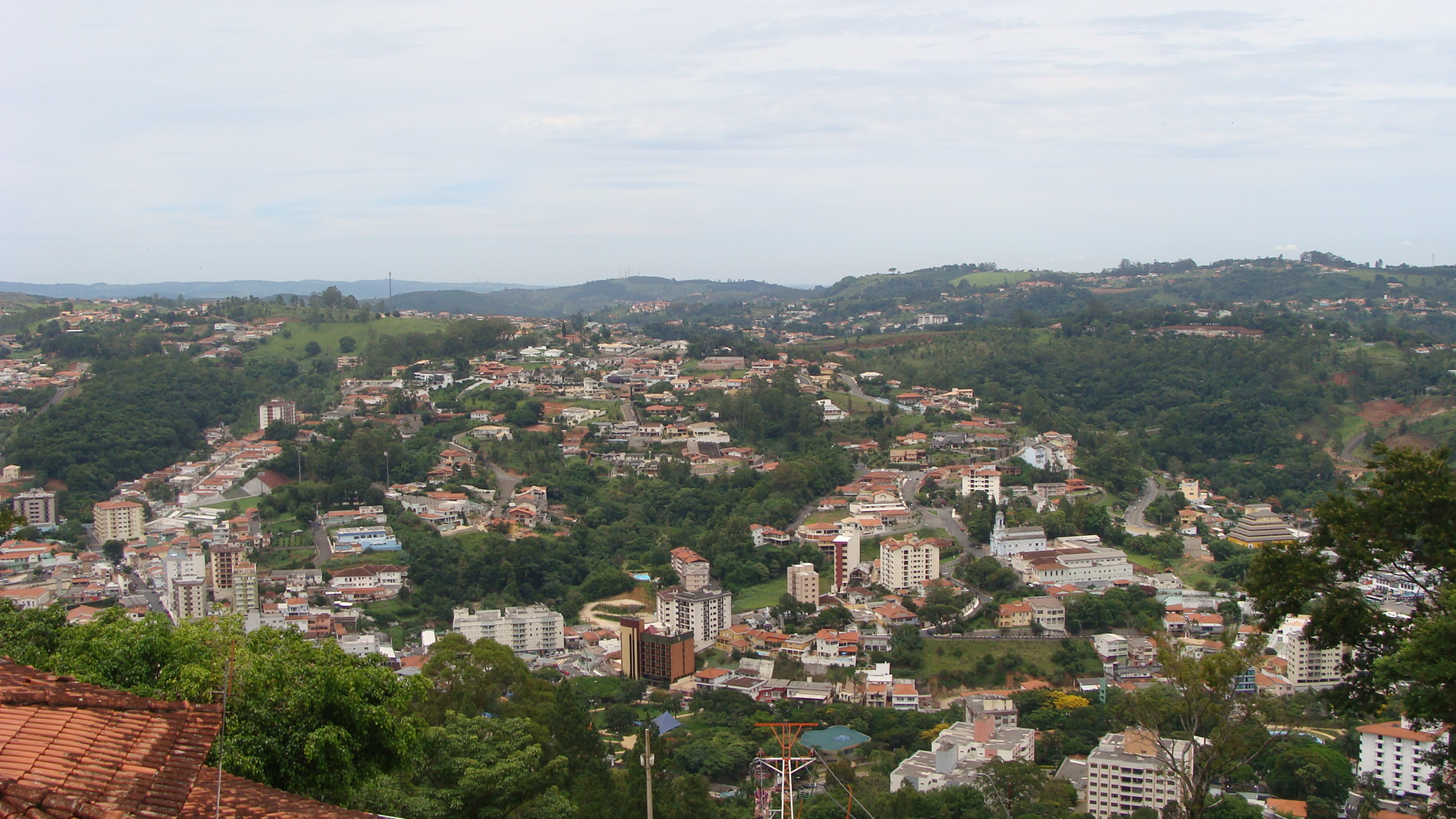
- A view of Serra Negra from the Morro do Mirante

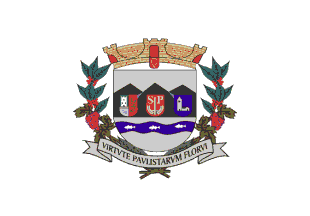
- Flag Coat of arms
- Motto: Virtvte Pavlistarvm Florvi (Latin for I flourish thanks to the valor of the people of São Paulo)
- Anthem: Serra Negra Meu Amor
- Location in the state of São Paulo
- Coordinates: 22°36′43″S 46°42′03″W
- Country: Brazil
- Region: Southeast
- State: São Paulo
- Founded: September 23, 1828

Government
  - Mayor: Elmir Chedid (PL)

Area
  - Total: 203.01 km^{2} (78.38 sq mi)
- Elevation: 925 m (3,035 ft)

Population (2020)
  - Total: 29,452
  - Density: 125.3/km^{2} (325/sq mi)
  - Demonym: Serra-negrense
- Time zone: UTC−3 (BRT)
- Postal code: 13930-000
- Area code: 19
- HDI (2000): 0.767 –high
- Website: Serra Negra

Serra Negra is a municipality in the state of São Paulo, Brazil. It belongs to the meso-region of Campinas. It has the total population of 29,452 as of 2020.

== Geography ==
The name of the city means black mountain range in the Portuguese language. It is located at an altitude of 925 m, in the Serra da Mantiqueira, a mountain range which runs mostly along the border of the state of São Paulo and Minas Gerais. It has a mild climate, being also a busy tourism spot, similarly to its close neighbours, the cities of Lindóia and Águas de Lindóia.

== History ==
Serra Negra was founded on 23 September 1828, but at least a century before that the region was already inhabited and was on the passageway between São Paulo and Minas Gerais. It was elevated to the status of city on 21 April 1885. At the end of the 19th century, the region received a large influx of European immigrants, mostly Italians, who came to work on coffee farms. Mineral water sources were discovered by Luiz Rielli in 1928 and the city became a much sought-after spa town (it is known as the "City of Health").

== Media ==
In telecommunications, the city was served by Companhia Telefônica Brasileira until 1973, when it began to be served by Telecomunicações de São Paulo. In July 1998, this company was acquired by Telefónica, which adopted the Vivo brand in 2012.

The company is currently an operator of cell phones, fixed lines, internet (fiber optics/4G) and television (satellite and cable).

== Religion ==
Christianity is present in the city as follows:

=== Catholic Church ===
The Catholic church in the municipality is part of the Roman Catholic Diocese of Amparo.

=== Protestant Church ===
The most diverse evangelical beliefs are present in the city, mainly Pentecostal, including the Assemblies of God in Brazil (the largest evangelical church in the country), Christian Congregation in Brazil, among others. These denominations are growing more and more throughout Brazil.

== Notable people ==
In 1962, war criminal and Nazi physician, Josef Mengele, also known as the Angel of Death purchased a coffee and cattle farm in Serra Negra with 2 of his associates Géza and Gitta Stammer, with Josef owning a half interest.

== See also ==
- List of municipalities in São Paulo
