= Lindóia =

- Municipality
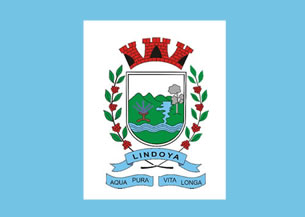
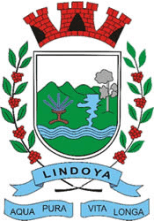
- Flag Coat of arms

- Location in São Paulo state

- Location in Brazil
- Coordinates: 22°31′23″S 46°39′0″W
- Country: Brazil
- Region: Southeast
- State: São Paulo

Area
  - Total: 48.8 km^{2} (18.8 sq mi)
- Elevation: 677 m (2,221 ft)

Population (2020)
  - Total: 8,092
  - Density: 166/km^{2} (429/sq mi)
- Time zone: UTC−3 (BRT)

Lindóia is a municipality in the state of São Paulo, Brazil.

Lindóia, 1973. National Archives of Brazil.

Lindóia is one of 11 municipalities considered spas by the State of São Paulo, in that it fulfills certain prerequisites set by state law. That status ensures those municipalities a special budget from the state for the promotion of regional tourism. Also, the municipality acquires the right to add its name next to the title of Hidromineral, the term by which it is known by both municipal officials and the state.

Lindóia is considered the Brazilian "National Capital of Mineral Water", as 40% of all bottled water consumed in Brazil comes from Lindóia. Bottlers in Lindóia include Lindoya Premium, Lindoya Bioleve, Lindoya Summer, Lindoya Life, Lindoya Original, Lindoya Joia, and Lindoya Genuine. These companies are allowed to take Lindoya in their packaging for demonstration of the origin of mineral water.

== History ==
The municipality was created by state law in 1938.

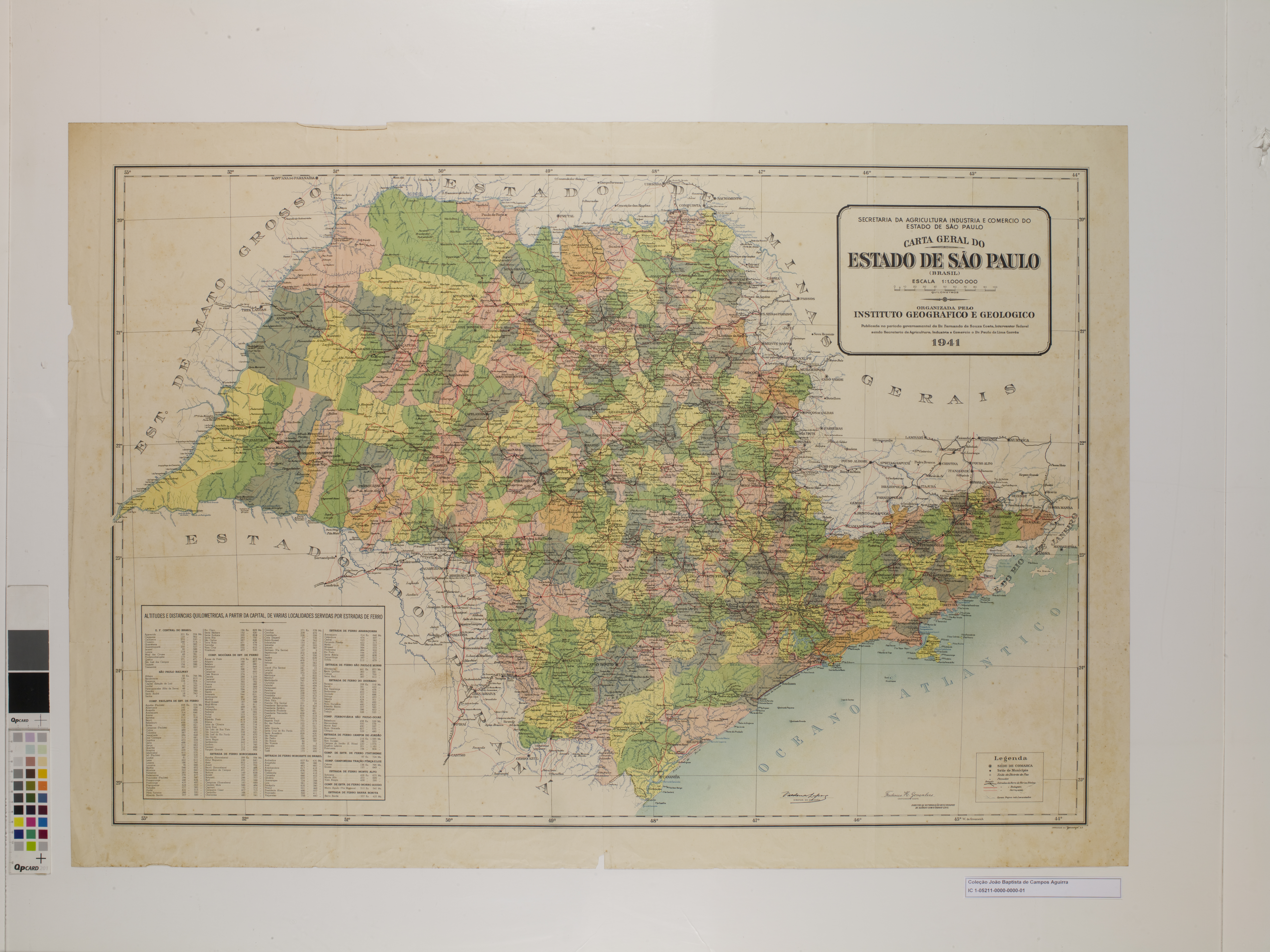
Map of the state of São Paulo (1938).

== Media ==
In telecommunications, the city was served by Companhia Telefônica Brasileira until 1973, when it began to be served by Telecomunicações de São Paulo. In July 1998, this company was acquired by Telefónica, which adopted the Vivo brand in 2012. The company is currently an operator of cell phones, fixed lines, internet (fiber optics/4G) and television (satellite and cable).

== Religion ==
Christianity is present in the city as follows:

=== Catholic Church ===
The Catholic church in the municipality is part of the Roman Catholic Diocese of Amparo.

=== Protestant Church ===
The most diverse evangelical beliefs are present in the city, mainly Pentecostal, including the Assemblies of God in Brazil (the largest evangelical church in the country), Christian Congregation in Brazil, among others. These denominations are growing more and more throughout Brazil.

== See also ==
- List of municipalities in São Paulo
