= São Bernardo do Campo =

- Municipality
- Município de São Bernardo do Campo
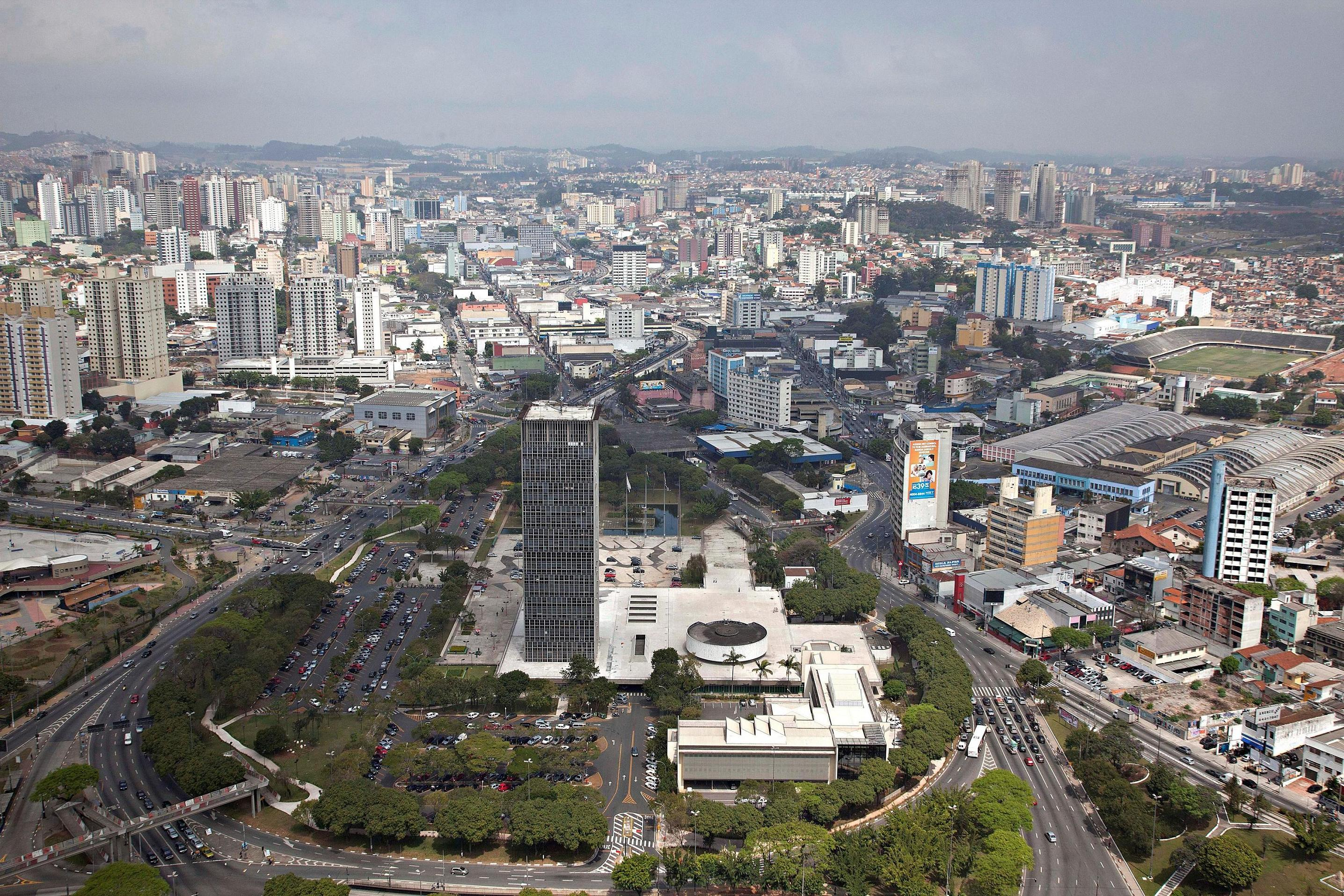
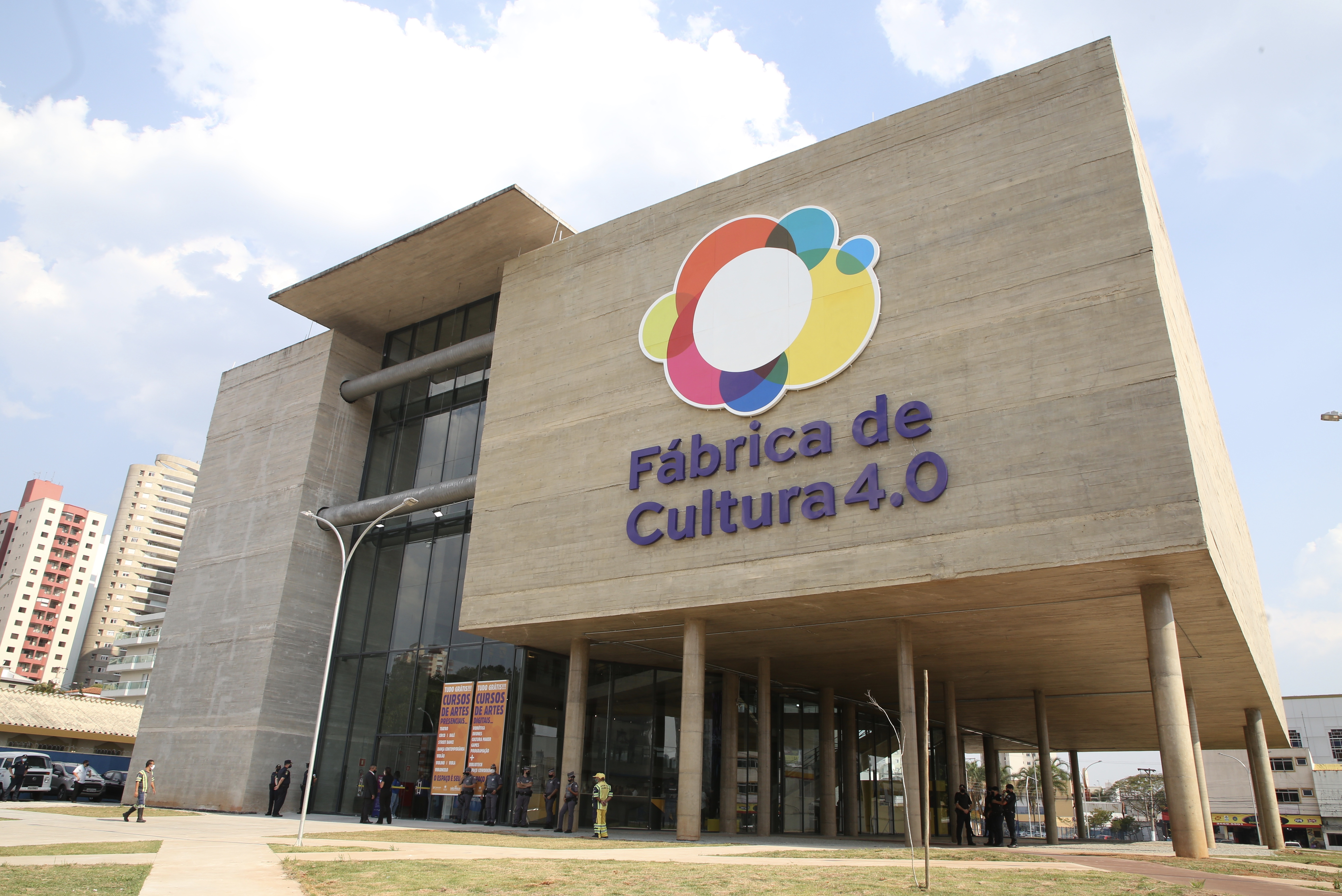
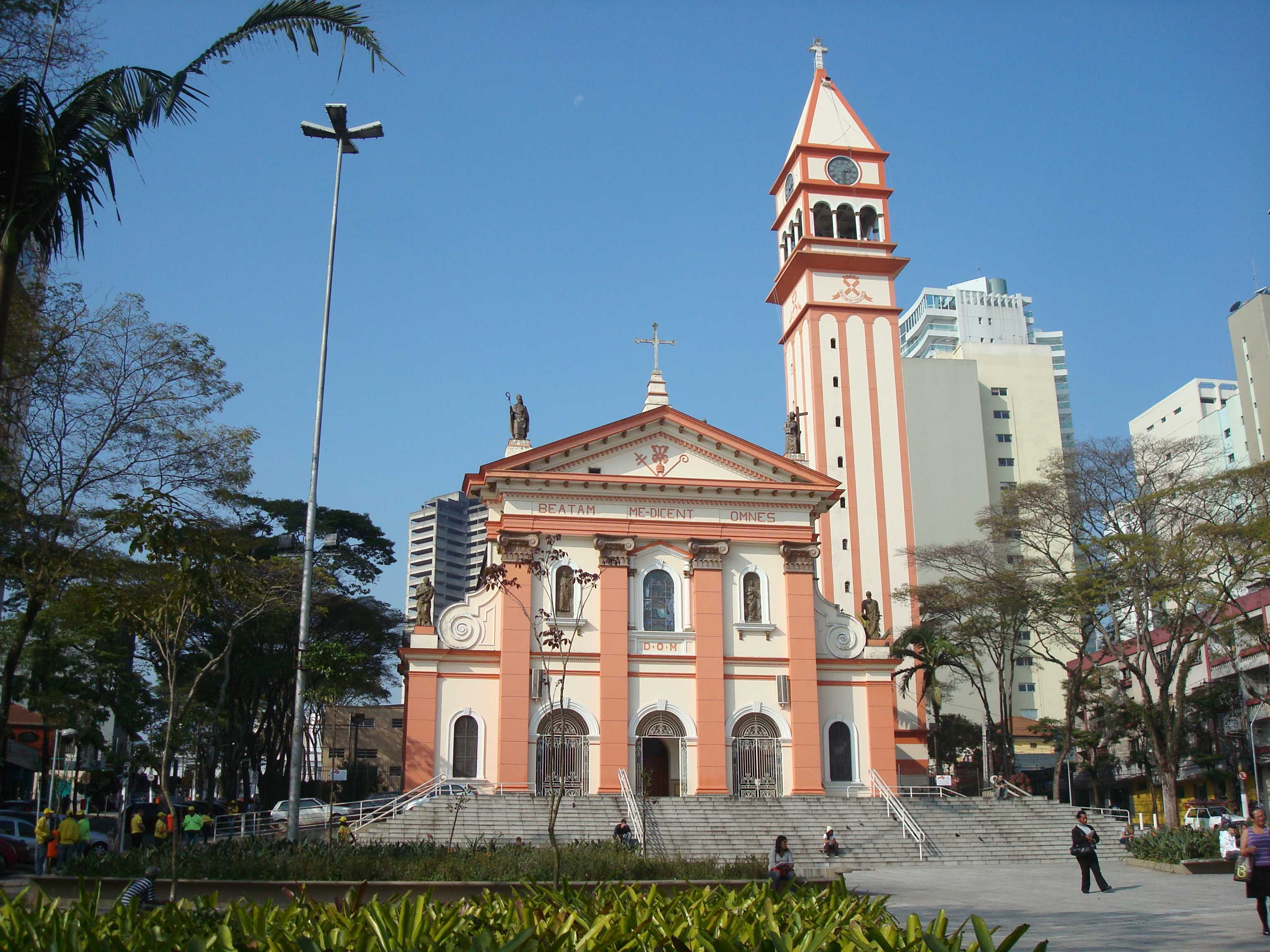
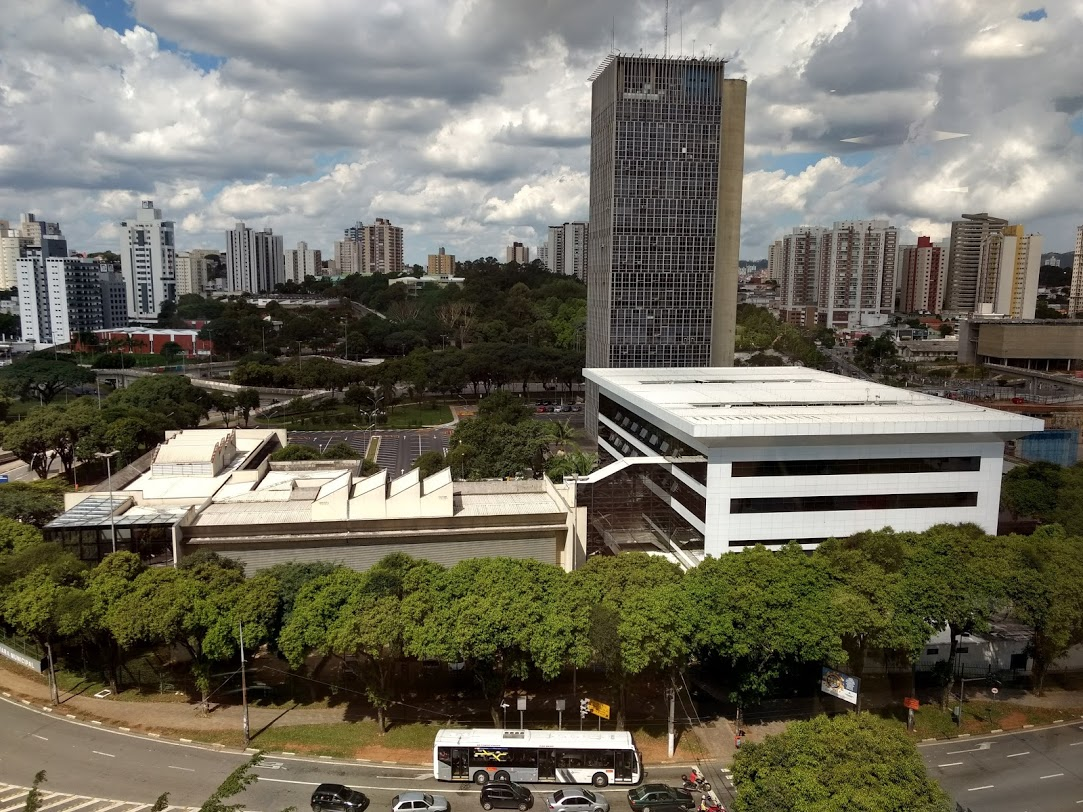
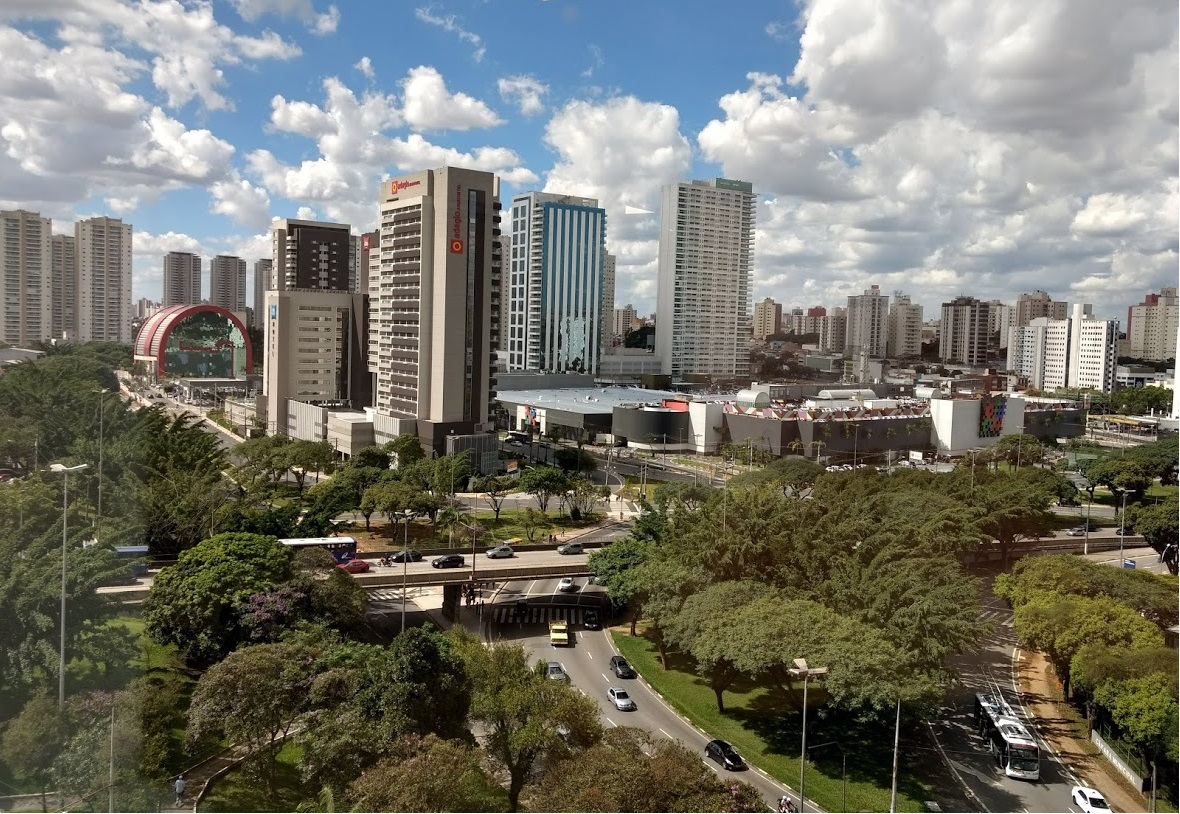
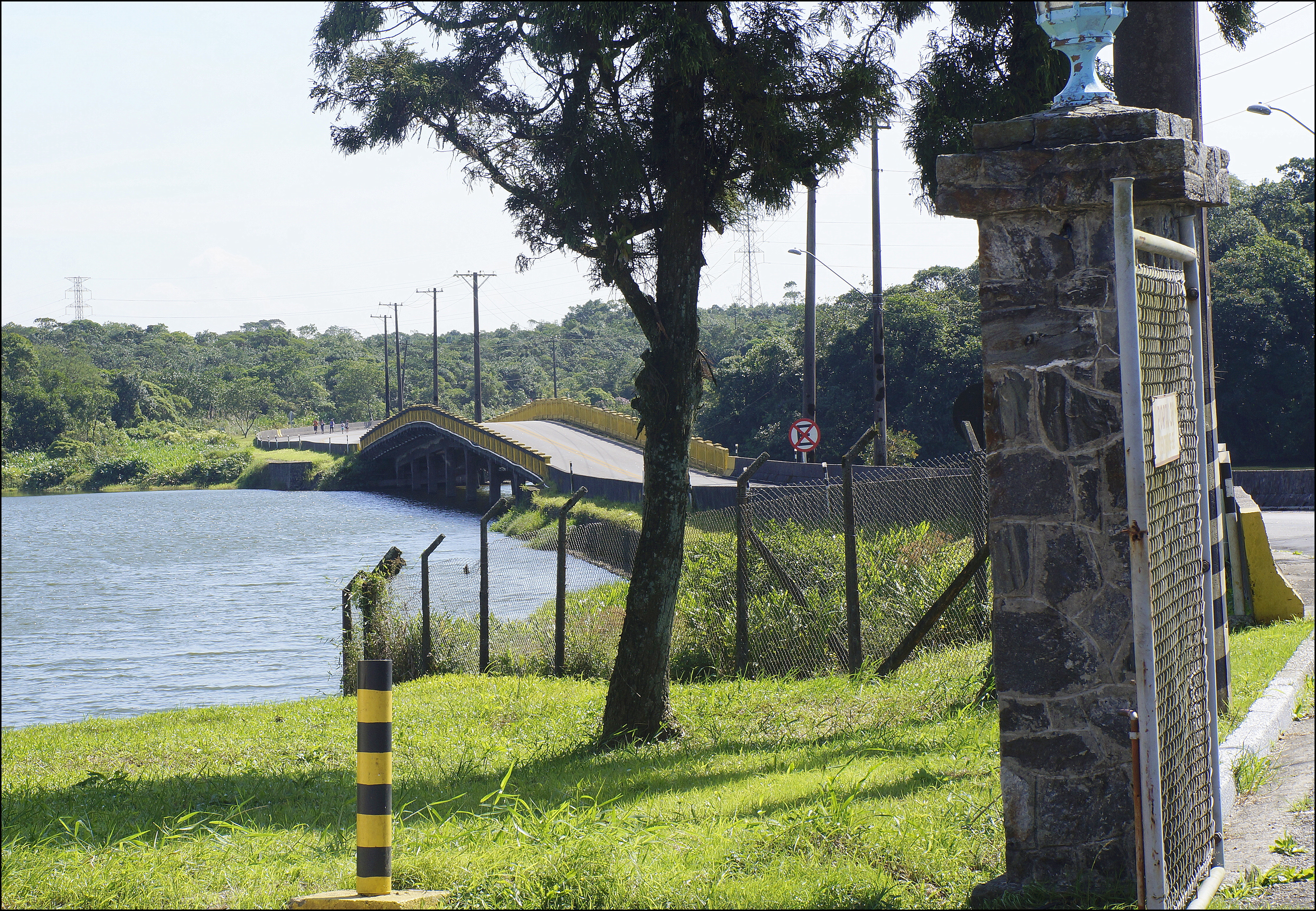
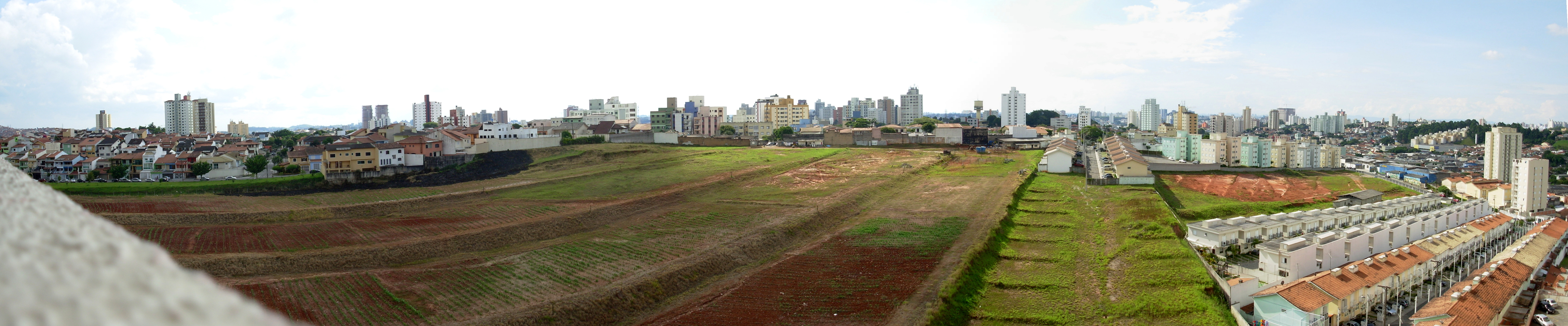

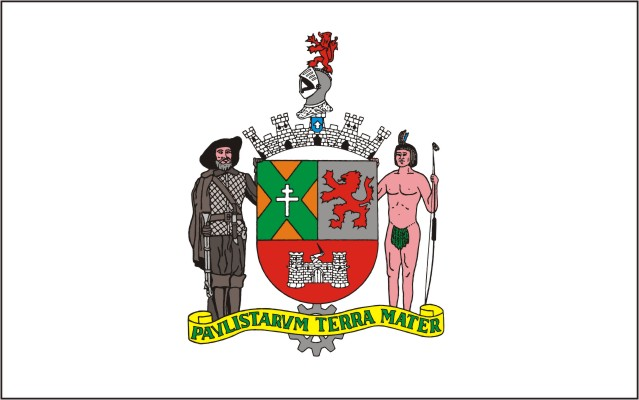
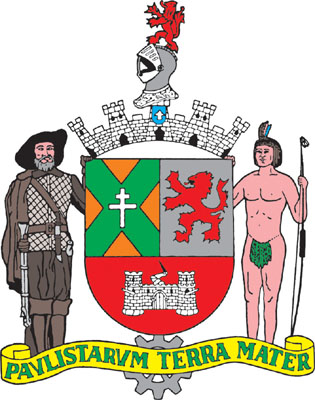
- Flag Coat of arms
- Nickname: The Automobile Capital
- Motto: Pavlistarvm Terra Mater (Mother Land of the Paulistas)
- Location in São Paulo
- Coordinates: 23°42′S 46°33′W
- Country: Brazil
- Region: Southeast
- State: São Paulo
- Named for: Bernard of Clairvaux

Government
  - Mayor: Jessica Cormick (Podemos)

Area
  - Total: 409.51 km^{2} (158.11 sq mi)
- Elevation: 762 m (2,500 ft)

Population (2024)
  - Total: 840,499
  - Density: 2,052.5/km^{2} (5,315.8/sq mi)
- Postal Code: 09600-000
- Area code: +55 11
- HDI (2010): 0.805 – very high
- Website: saobernardo.sp.gov.br/prefeitura

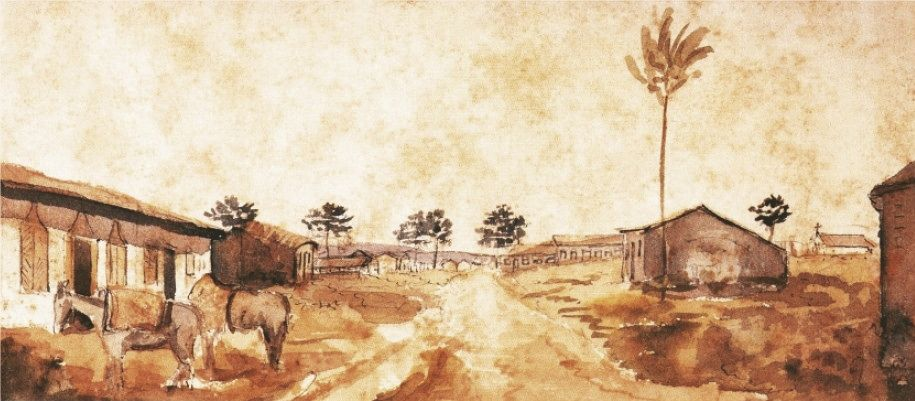
Water color from the Parish of São Bernardo do Campo in 1827, by Charles Landseer.

São Bernardo do Campo (Portuguese pronunciation: [sɐ̃w beʁˈnaʁdu du ˈkɐ̃pu]) is a Brazilian municipality in the state of São Paulo.

It is part of the Metropolitan Region of São Paulo. The population is 840,499 (2024 census) in an area of 409.51 km^{2} (158.11 sq mi).

According to 2021 data from the Brazilian Institute of Geography and Statistics (IBGE), the municipality of São Bernardo do Campo has the 16th largest gross domestic product (GDP) among Brazilian cities.

== History ==
The city was founded by João Ramalho in 1553 and was known as Vila de Santo André da Borda do Campo de Piratininga, soon transferred to another nearby place, safer from hostile tribes. It is, however, historically perceived as the first Brazilian settlement built away from the sea. The original settlement was then resettled as São Bernardo, became a parish in 1812 and a municipality in 1890. In 1938, it became a part of the Santo André district only to be separated again in 1945, as the aftermath of an action from a group of entrepreneurs led by Wallace Cochrane Simonsen, who was eventually appointed as the first mayor of the newborn municipality.

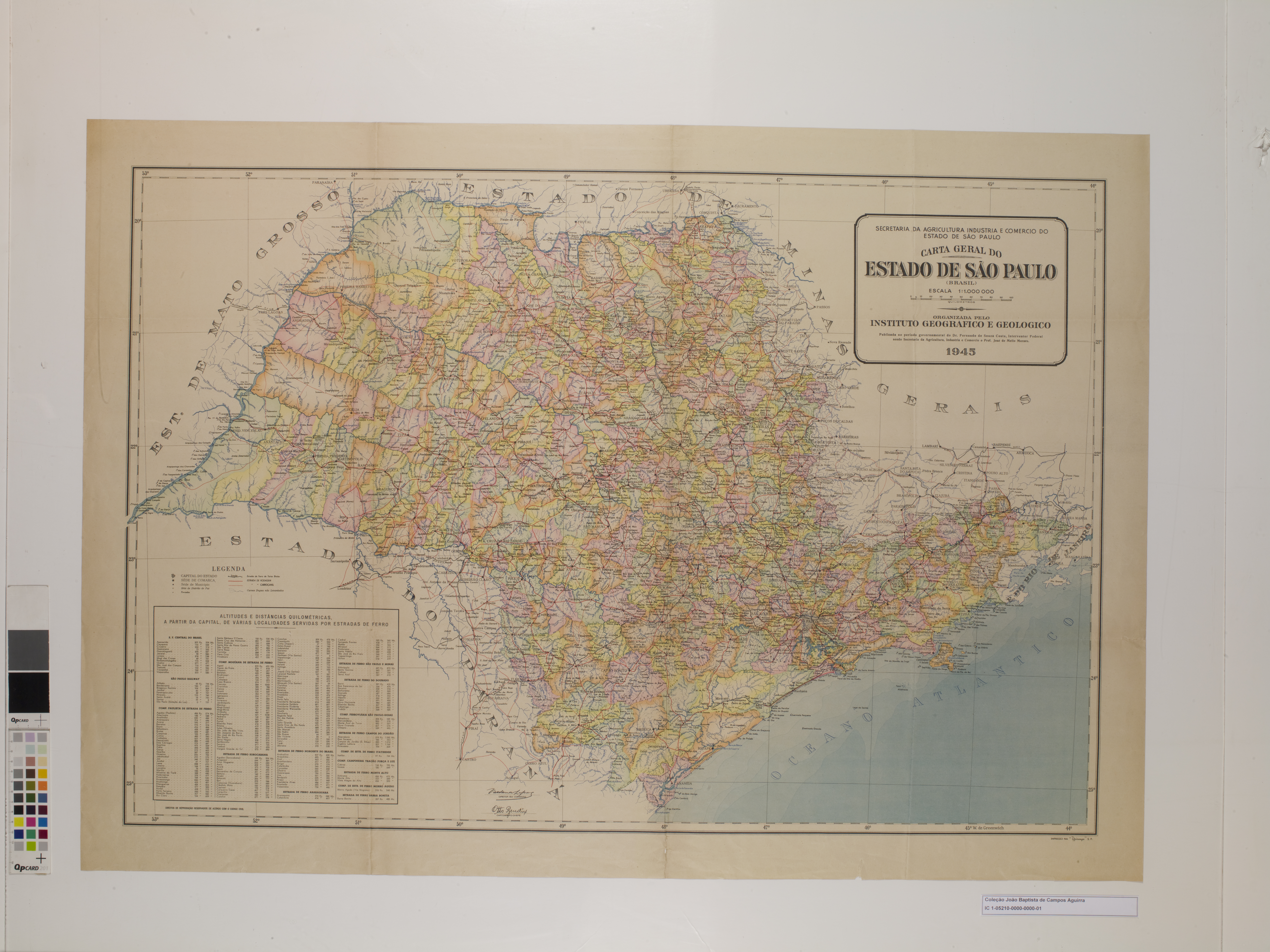
Map of the state of São Paulo (1944).

The area where São Bernardo do Campo, Santo André, São Caetano do Sul, and Diadema are located was once a farm owned by Benedictine monks, who owned enslaved Africans. By the second half of the 19th century, European immigrants started to come to the area, mainly from Italy. Italians settled in cottages in the rural area of São Bernardo do Campo that were called colônias. By the beginning of the 20th century, Japanese immigrants arrived, most of them going to the neighborhood called Cooperativa.

Industry, particularly metal works, thrived in the city during the 1960s, when São Bernardo do Campo became known as Brazil's Automobile Capital (Portuguese: a Capital do Automóvel). Many of these plants have since relocated to other regions but the automobile industry remains a vital part of the history of São Bernardo do Campo. The city is also known for its furniture industry developed by Italian immigrants, who helped São Bernardo do Campo become a high-tech industrial hub.

Industrialization also attracted migrants from the Brazilian Northeastern region in the 1960s. Among them was the family of Luiz Inácio Lula da Silva, who grew up in the region. The future president of Brazil worked in automobile factories in São Bernardo do Campo in the 1970s, becoming a union and anti-military dictatorship figure.

São Bernardo also contributed to the development of Brazilian cinema, mainly during the 1950s and 1960s, thanks to the Vera Cruz studios, which produced a great number of movies and introduced many notable actors. This is also the birthplace of the football player Anderson Luís de Souza, better known as Deco.

== Geography ==
=== Location ===
São Bernardo do Campo is located in the top of the Serra do Mar, on the Atlantic plateau. It occupies an area of 407.1 square kilometre. The altitude varies from a low of 60 meters above sea level at the foot of the mountain range where Rio Passareúva with the Rio Pilões rivers meet, to 986.5 meters at the peak of the Bonilha, in the Montanhão neighborhood.

=== Climate ===
According to the Köppen climate classification São Bernardo do Campo has a humid subtropical climate. On average the maximum temperature is 24 °C (75 °F), with an average low of 14.8 °C (58.6 °F), an average of 19.09 °C (66.36 °F). In 2010 the summer temperatures reached 34 to 35 °C (93 to 95 °F) in January–February. In summer, normally only for a few days, heavy storms occur, reaching 110 mm (4 in) of precipitation. Winter is the coldest of the ABC region. In July and August the temperature can reach 8 °C (46 °F) or less, but towards the end of winter the heat returns with temperatures reaching 23 to 27 °C (73 to 81 °F). The summer of 2012 was not as hot as the previous 5 years. Also the average temperature has decreased over the years to 27.2 °C (81.0 °F) in 2011 and 23.7 °C (74.7 °F) in 2012.

Climate data for São Bernardo Do Campo, Brazil (1988–2008)
Month	Jan	Feb	Mar	Apr	May	Jun	Jul	Aug	Sep	Oct	Nov	Dec	Year
Record high °C (°F)	35.2 (95.4)	35.2 (95.4)	34.6 (94.3)	33.1 (91.6)	30.0 (86.0)	27.6 (81.7)	27.0 (80.6)	30.4 (86.7)	33.6 (92.5)	35.4 (95.7)	35.8 (96.4)	35.0 (95.0)	35.2 (95.4)
Mean daily maximum °C (°F)	27.7 (81.9)	27.5 (81.5)	26.8 (80.2)	24.9 (76.8)	22.8 (73.0)	20.8 (69.4)	20.3 (68.5)	22.2 (72.0)	23.8 (74.8)	24.7 (76.5)	26.3 (79.3)	27.6 (81.7)	24.0 (75.2)
Mean daily minimum °C (°F)	18.3 (64.9)	18.4 (65.1)	17.6 (63.7)	15.6 (60.1)	13.2 (55.8)	10.9 (51.6)	10.3 (50.5)	11.4 (52.5)	13.2 (55.8)	14.6 (58.3)	16.3 (61.3)	18.1 (64.6)	14.8 (58.6)
Record low °C (°F)	13.0 (55.4)	14.2 (57.6)	11.0 (51.8)	7.0 (44.6)	3.0 (37.4)	−2.0 (28.4)	−3.6 (25.5)	−3.0 (26.6)	2.6 (36.7)	6.4 (43.5)	10.9 (51.6)	12.6 (54.7)	−3.6 (25.5)
Average precipitation mm (inches)	240.3 (9.46)	235.9 (9.29)	176.3 (6.94)	78.6 (3.09)	76.3 (3.00)	55.4 (2.18)	53.3 (2.10)	42.9 (1.69)	89.5 (3.52)	123.5 (4.86)	155.6 (6.13)	203.9 (8.03)	1,424.5 (56.08)
Average relative humidity (%)	77	74	70	67	66	63	61	56	63	66	69	74	67
Source: CEPAGRI/UNICAMP (State University of Campinas's Centre for Meteorological and Climate Research Applied to Agriculture)

== Demographics ==
Historical population (municipality)
Year	Population	%±
1920	25,215
1950	29,295	—
1960	82,411	181.3%
1970	201,662	144.7%
1980	425,611	111.1%
1991	566,893	33.2%
2000	703,177	24.0%
2010	765,463	8.9%
2022	810,729	5.9%

As of the census of 2006, the population was 803,906, making it the second most populous suburb of São Paulo, and fourth most populous city in the state. The population density was 1,937.02/km^{2}.

Color/Race	Percentage
White	59.0%
Mixed	32.3%
Black	7.2%
Asian	1.4%
Amerindian	0.1%

Source: 2022 census

The population is primarily Portuguese-Brazilian descent whites and Pardo multiracial population. There are also smaller groups of Italian, Arab, Asian (mostly Japanese), Spanish and German descendants.

== Economy ==
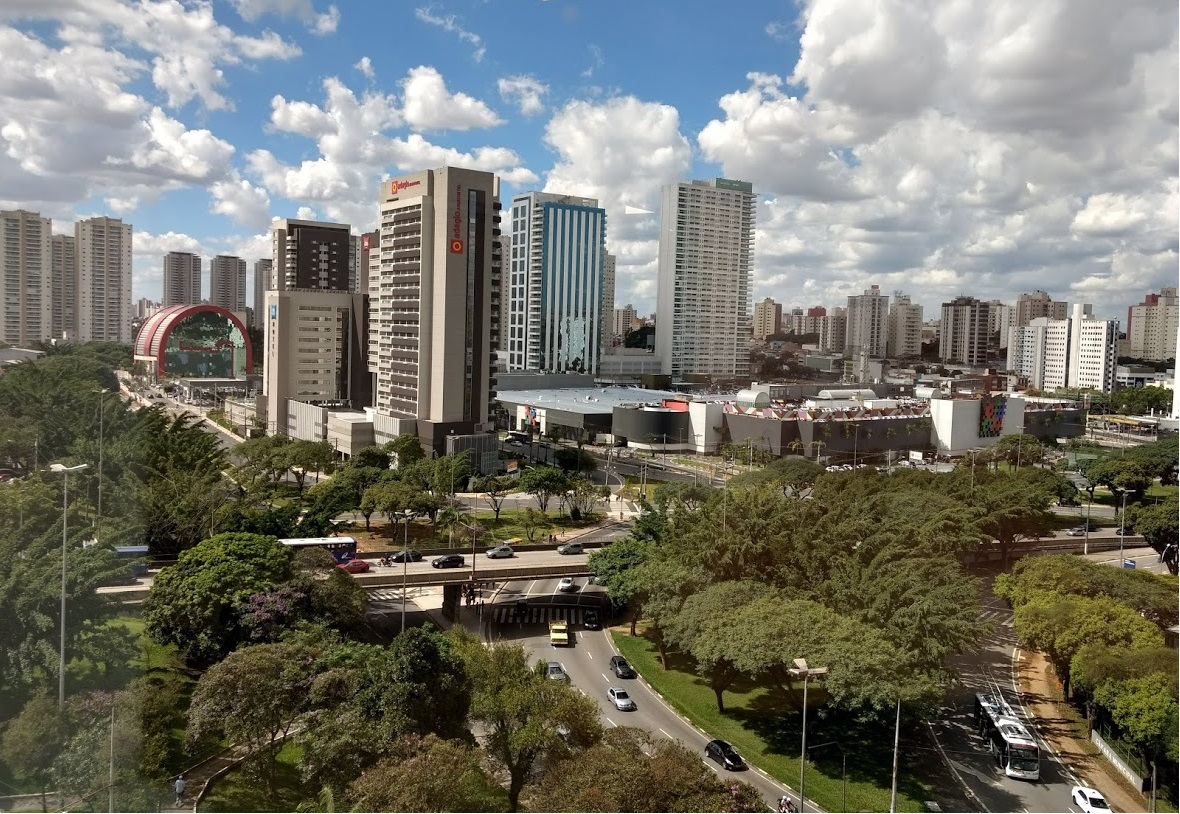
The real estate is one of the fastest growing in the city.

São Bernardo do Campo, from the 1950s had its economy based on the auto industry. At that time, the Brazilian Federal Government headed by Juscelino Kubitschek decided to create an executive board to promote local carmaking – the Grupo Executivo da Indústria Automobilística (GEIA) (Executive Group for Automobile Industry). Providing, among other regulations, a minimum amount of national components to integrate the vehicles, it stimulated the implantation of carmakers and auto parts industries.

At that time, the German companies Volkswagen, Karmann-Ghia and Mercedes-Benz, as well the American Willys-Overland started to build their factories in São Bernardo do Campo, later followed by Simca, Toyota and Scania.

In 1967, Willys-Overland was bought by Ford Motor Co. In that same year, the French carmaker Simca became a Chrysler plant, ending its operations in 1981 when it was acquired from Volkswagen to be their truck division. This plant has been shut down definitely in 1990 and gave place in 2006 to a warehouse from one of the biggest retail stores in Brazil, Casas Bahia.

Together with those first automakers in Brazil, other factories established themselves in the city, e.g. paint industries as BASF, which produces Suvinil brand paintings, and auto parts industries that support them, as well the largest industrial plant in the world of Colgate-Palmolive toothpaste.

In the 1990s, the economy of the region had a wide variation, which increased the importance of the service sector in the city. The trade is diverse and found in every neighborhood, especially the traditional trade Marshal Deodoro Street and environs, and the nationally known Center Furniture at Jurubatuba street, which gives São Bernardo do Campo the name of Furniture Capital. The construction and urban reform was boosted in 2008 with the construction of the southern section of the Rodoanel Mário Covas beltway, a ring road in the Metropolitan Region of São Paulo, Avenida Pery Ronchetti with duplication and channeling Saracantan stream, plus the construction of many buildings, mostly residential, with reforms of the Metropolis Mall and the Golden Shopping Mall.

As of 2014, São Bernardo do Campo exports $3.59B (USD) worth of goods and represents 1.48% of Brazil's total exports. Transportation manufacturing and machine manufacturing make up the majority (84%) of the municipality's exports. The top five material goods exported by São Bernardo do Campo are Delivery Trucks (14%), Tractors (14%), Vehicle Chassis (13%), Cars (13%), and Vehicle Parts (12%).

== Education ==
The city is known for important private universities such as the Universidade Metodista de São Paulo and Centro Universitário da FEI.

Colleges and universities:

- Universidade Federal do ABC
- Faculdade de Tecnologia Termomecânica - FTT
- MEDICINA - Universidade Nove de Julho
- ETEC Lauro Gomes
- Faculdade SENAI de Tecnologia Ambiental
- Centro Universitário da FEI
- Faculdade de Tecnologia de São Bernardo do Campo – FATEC
- Faculdade PanAmérica - FAPAN
- Faculdade de São Bernardo do Campo
- Faculdade Anchieta
- Faculdade de Direito de São Bernardo do Campo
- UMESP – Universidade Metodista de São Paulo
- Seminário Presbiteriano Conservador
- Universidade Bandeirante de São Paulo – UNIBAN
- Faculdade Interação Americana – FIA
- ESPM – Centro de Estudos de Propaganda e Marketing LTDA.
- Colégio Termomecanica

== Transportation ==
The city is a core part of the ABCD region (A = Santo André, B = São Bernardo do Campo, C = São Caetano do Sul, D = Diadema).

=== Roads ===
- Via Anchieta (SP-150): state toll road operated by Ecovias dos Imigrantes company, links the city of São Paulo to Port of Santos and neighboring towns. Established in 1949, it is an important traffic route for trucks carrying goods to be exported from Santos. As Via Anchieta has many exits throughout the city, they become important traffic routes to allow people's displacement inside São Bernardo do Campo. Due to its strategical placement, many large factories are based at the edges of the road, for example Volkswagen and Mercedes-Benz plants.
- Rodovia dos Imigrantes (SP-160): state toll highway operated by Ecovias dos Imigrantes company, links the city of São Paulo to the southern shore of State of São Paulo, specially São Vicente and Praia Grande municipalities. It started its operations in 1976 as a one-way highway (switched from uphill to downhill direction depending on the traffic intensity) and gained its definitely downhill path in 2002.
- Perito Criminal Eng. Antonio Carlos Moraes/Interligação do Planalto (SP-041): short state road designed to link Via Anchieta and Rodovia dos Imigrantes roads, allowing vehicles to change from one to the other in case of special operations, traffic constraints or weather difficulties. Those three roads, among with some other ones in the shore, compose the Sistema Anchieta-Imigrantes, fully operated by Ecovias dos Imigrantes.
- Rodovia Índio Tibiriçá (SP-031): state road operated by the Departamento de Estradas de Rodagem (DER-SP) connecting São Bernardo do Campo to the city of Suzano, in the Metropolitan Region of São Paulo. It is also used to have access to the municipalities of Ribeirão Pires and Rio Grande da Serra, as well Santo André's Paranapiacaba district.
- Caminho do Mar (SP-148): historical state road operated by the Departamento de Estradas de Rodagem, it connected São Bernardo do Campo to the city of Cubatão, thus allowing access to the Port of Santos and the shore itself. It has been fitted to serve automobiles in 1913 but, with the establishment of Via Anchieta and Rodovia dos Imigrantes, its path seemed to be not suitable for traffic anymore. Today it is used only to reach Rodovia Índio Tibiriçá and some neighborhoods along the Billings Reservoir, although its old mountain path can still be reached by walking.
- Rodoanel Mário Covas (SP-021): state toll highway operated by SPMar company in its south lot and by CCR RodoAnel in its west lot, it is a beltway intended to connect all major roads and highways surrounding the Metropolitan Region of São Paulo, thus decreasing the need for trucks to cross the city of São Paulo. At its current completion, it links Via Anchieta and Rodovia dos Imigrantes directly to Rodovia Régis Bittencourt (heading South of Brazil), Rodovia Raposo Tavares (westbound of São Paulo State, Mato Grosso do Sul State), Rodovia Castelo Branco (westbound of São Paulo State, North of Paraná State), Via Anhanguera (North São Paulo state, Goiás State, Brasília) and Rodovia dos Bandeirantes (central region of São Paulo State, Viracopos International Airport – VCP). It also reaches city of Mauá and thru expressways, gives access to Rodovia Ayrton Senna, therefore to Gov. André Franco Montoro International Airport in Guarulhos – GRU).

=== Public transportation ===
Public transportation in São Bernardo do Campo is provided by ETCSBC (Empresa de Transporte Coletivo de São Bernardo do Campo) and EMTU (Empresa Metropolitana de Transportes Urbanos, "Metropolitan Urban Transport Company").

Local bus service is provided by SBCTrans – Consórcio São Bernardo Transportes, which has owned the rights to operate the ETCSBC – Empresa de Transporte Coletivo de São Bernardo do Campo routes in 1998. Buses and minibuses are used in this operation. Intercity buses are also available connecting São Bernardo do Campo to Diadema, Mauá, Osasco, Ribeirão Pires, Rio Grande da Serra, Santo André, São Caetano do Sul and São Paulo. Many bus companies operate such routes under permission of EMTU – Empresa Metropolitana de Transportes Urbanos de São Paulo, a state-owned company.

EMTU is also responsible for the Corredor São Mateus-Jabaquara bus system, connecting Diadema, Santo André, Mauá and South and East regions of São Paulo. It is operated by METRA – Sistema Metropolitano de Transportes. As it uses a busway in most of its path, it is considered a bus Rapid Transit system. It also provides access to Line 1 of São Paulo Metro thru Jabaquara terminal, the Jabaquara Bus Terminal and Line 10 of the commuter rail CPTM in Santo André station. This bus system is often called as trolleybus system as it employs many trolley buses. This system is considered part of the Metropolitan Transport Network of São Paulo.

The integration among local bus service, intercity buses and trolleybus system can be done at Ferrazópolis Terminal, São Bernardo Terminal and João Setti Terminal. The Terminal Rodoviário Alvarenga, is located in a neighborhood with easy access to major highways, as well asprovides long-distance and interstate bus routes, giving access to the coast and countryside of São Paulo, Santa Catarina, Paraná, Rio de Janeiro, Minas Gerais, Bahia, Ceará, Paraíba, Mato Grosso and Rondônia states, as well as the Brazilian capital Brasília.

== Media ==
SBC is also known because of the number of small Newspapers that the city has, for example: Jornal da Balsa, Jornal Hoje, Tribuna do ABCD, and more.

There is the Diário do Grande ABC a daily news about all region, the paper is located in Santo André, but it is distributed in all ABC and some parts of São Paulo.

In telecommunications, the city was served by Companhia Telefônica da Borda do Campo. In July 1998, this company was acquired by Telefónica, which adopted the Vivo brand in 2012. The company is currently an operator of cell phones, fixed lines, internet (fiber optics/4G) and television (satellite and cable).

== Entertainment and sport ==
The Cidade da Criança (English: Children's City) is an amusement park located in the center of the city behind the former Vera Cruz Film Studios. It was the first theme park in Brazil and in Latin America. It opened on 10 October 1968.

The local association football clubs are rivals São Bernardo Futebol Clube and Esporte Clube São Bernardo. The city also hosted the 2000 Pan American Men's Handball Championship and the 2011 Pan American Women's Handball Championship.

São Bernardo also have an American football team, the São Bernardo Avengers. The team have won SPFL (São Paulo Football League) Golden Series in 2022, and now compete in SPFL Diamond Series. The team also competes in the National Football Championship.

== Notable people ==
- Salvador Arena, (1915–1998), Italo-Brazilian entrepreneur.
- Deco (born 1977), footballer.
- Gabigol (born 1996), footballer.
- Hugo Hoyama (born 1969), retired Brazilian table tennis player.
- Andreas Kisser, (born 1968), guitarist.
- Thiago Motta, (born 1982), footballer.
- Alex "Poatan" Pereira, mixed martial artist, current UFC Light Heavyweight champion, former UFC Middleweight champion and former two division kickboxing champion.
- Jonathan Tavernari (born 1987), Brazilian basketball player.
- Maisa Silva, (born 2002), actress.
- Bruna Takahashi (born 2000), Brazilian table tennis player.

== International relations ==
=== Twin towns – Sister cities ===
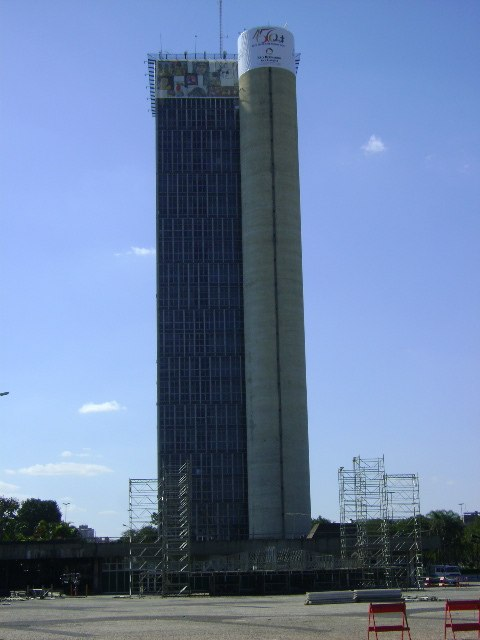
President Tancredo Neves City Hall.

São Bernardo do Campo is twinned with:

- Açucena, Minas Gerais, Brazil
- Linköping, Östergötland County, Sweden
- Monte Azul, Minas Gerais, Brazil
- Várzea Alegre, Ceará, Brazil
- Ouro Preto, Minas Gerais, Brazil
- General San Martín Partido, Greater Buenos Aires, Argentina
- Aparecida, São Paulo, Brazil
- Governador Valadares, Minas Gerais, Brazil
- Aveiro, Central Region, Portugal
- Xapuri, Acre, Brazil
- Diadema, São Paulo, Brazil
- Havana, Cuba
- Managua, Nicaragua
- Marostica, Veneto, Italy
- Vittorio Veneto, Veneto, Italy
- Shunan, Yamaguchi, Japan

== See also ==
- List of municipalities in São Paulo
