= SP-59 (São Paulo highway) =

Highway in São Paulo

SP-059

Location
- Country: Brazil
- State: São Paulo

Highway system
- Highways in Brazil; Federal; São Paulo State Highways

The SP-059 (also known as Baixada Interlink or Planície Interlink) is a highway in the southeastern part of the state of São Paulo in Brazil. The highway is unnamed on its entire length. The highway links the highways Rodovia Anchieta (SP-150) and Imigrantes (SP-160), it enters the Planalto Interlink between the two highways, the SP-150 and the SP-160. It runs entirely in the municipality of Cubatão. The highway concessions is controlled by the transportation company EcoRodovias.
