= Tereza Delta =

Brazilian politician

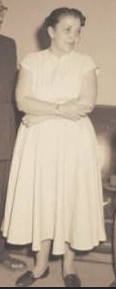
- Congresswoman Tereza Delta in a committee of officials of the State Department of Traffic (DER), on the hunger strike of the Department's workers on Via Anchieta, who were 4 months behind in their wages, on December 15.

2nd Mayor of São Bernardo do Campo
- In office April 11, 1947 – December 31, 1947
- Preceded by: Wallace Cochrane Simonsen
- Succeeded by: José Fornari

Personal details
- Born: November 2, 1910 São Paulo, SP, Brazil
- Died: August 6, 1993 (aged 82) São Bernardo do Campo, SP, Brazil
- Occupation: Politician, entrepreneur

Tereza Delta (São Paulo, November 2, 1919 – São Bernardo do Campo, August 6, 1993) was a Brazilian politician, being one of the first women to hold the office of mayor in Brazil. For her leading role in the Chamber of Councillors of São Bernardo do Campo, she was honored with the name of the plenary of this legislative house.

== Political career ==
Around 1943, she came to live in São Bernardo, settling in a farm at the confluence of the roads Mar and Vergueiro.

In late 1946 and early 1947, she embraced Adhemar de Barros's campaign for governor of the State of São Paulo, and in the city she supported the popular movement of protest against the city hall, in the face of the problems of lack of sugar, oil and other items, gaining general sympathy. Adhemar de Barros, after being elected and sworn in as governor, removed Wallace Simonsen from the city hall and appointed Tereza as mayor in a buffer mandate, taking office in 1947. She would remain in office until the end of that year, when elections were held for councilman and mayor.

Tereza Delta was elected a councilwoman with the highest number of votes ever recorded in São Bernardo until then. She was elected mayor of the Chamber between 1948 and 1951, when she stepped aside to take up a seat in the State Assembly, to which she had been elected as a congresswoman, serving from 1951 to 1955. During this mandate she swas responsible for the creation of the first state school in the city, the Instituto de Educação João Ramalho, the construction of the Maria Iracema Munhoz School Group building, the construction of the viaduct at kilometer 23 of the Anchieta Highway and also the completion by the State of the works of the first public hospital in the city, today called Hospital Escola Anchieta. At the same time, she coordinated the construction and succeeded, in 1953, in raising the municipality to the category of comarca, whose forum was installed two years later by the acting mayor, Sigismundo Sérgio Ballotim.

In 1960, she again served as a State Congresswoman, as an alternate called for a temporary seat in the State Legislative Assembly. After she withdrew from politics, she continued to devote herself to the activities of a micro-entrepreneur and died on August 6, 1993.

== See also ==
- São Bernardo do Campo
- Legislative Assembly of São Paulo

Preceded by Wallace Cochrane Simonsen	Mayor of São Bernardo do Campo; October 27, 1947 – January 1, 1948	Succeeded by José Fornari
