= Cidade da Criança =

Amusement park in Brazil

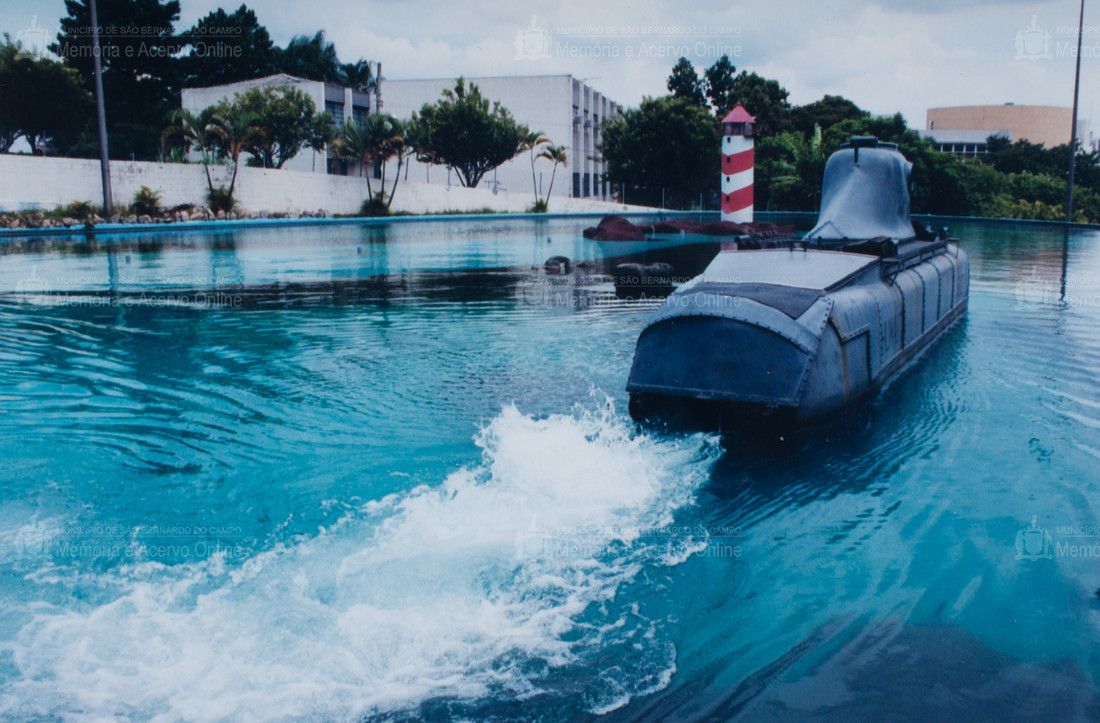
- Submarine from the park in 2003.
- Interactive map of Cidade da Criança
- Location: São Bernardo do Campo, São Paulo, Brazil
- Coordinates: 23°41′16.17″S 46°33′26.13″W
- Status: Operating
- Opened: October 10, 1968; 57 years ago
- Owner: Expoaqua (concession)
- General manager: São Paulo Aquarium
- Theme: Playground
- Operating season: Tuesday to Sunday from 9 am to 5 pm. (BRT)
- Area: 37.742m²

Attractions
- Total: +35
- Roller coasters: 1
- Website: Cidade da Criança

The Cidade da Criança ('Children's City') is a Brazilian amusement park located in the center of São Bernardo do Campo, in the metropolitan region of São Paulo, behind the former Vera Cruz Film Studios. It was the first theme park in Brazil and in Latin America, when it opened on October 10, 1968.

It is divided into three themed areas. One of the themes is the Amazon, containing a replica of the Amazon Theatre, the Madeira-Mamoré Railroad and several other characteristic figures of the region. Among its most famous attractions, is a replica of a submarine (with 2.75 million liters of water that made the Cidade da Criança the first of its kind in the Southern Hemisphere and the third overall park with this attraction), a plane, the Minhocão (roller coaster), the Casa Maluca (Crazy House), among others.

The park was built in the 1950s as a studio for recording the soap opera Redenção, from TV Excelsior. Even after the end of the soap opera in 1968, visits by the public to the city continued. This was also the first Brazilian film city.

The land and area built for the recording of the soap opera Redenção were listed by the Municipal Council of Historical and Cultural Heritage in 1990.

== Vera Cruz Studios ==
Vera Cruz Studios are adjacent to the grounds of the Cidade da Criança. At the beginning of the soap opera Redenção, a city from the interior of São Paulo was built on that 37,742m² plot that had been ceded by the City Hall, with a church, police station, forum, train station and some houses as requested by the script. This scene still exists, and is in the Redenção region.

After the end of the recordings, the land was returned to City Hall, and soon after, then Mayor Aldino Pinotti entered into a public-private partnership for the addition of attractions.

== Closing ==
Attendance peaked in the 70's and 80's, after which the park went into decline, suffering from competition from Playcenter and Hopi Hari, was reformed in 1970 and had a period of expansion from 1971 to 1976. In 2005 it was closed by the São Bernardo do Campo City Hall due to lack of security and lack of equipment maintenance; the town hall was planning to make the park an educational site. At the time of closing, several attractions managed by third parties were in poor condition.

The project to transform Cidade da Criança into an educational park suffered some setbacks, as the São Paulo State Court of Auditors rejected the resources proposed from the Department of Education, given that the space was not built from a pedagogical project. As a result, the city intended to launch a concession bid for the operation and maintenance of the park.

=== Closure due to Coronavirus ===
Due to the COVID-19 pandemic in Brazil, Mayor Orlando Morando closed the Cidade da Criança and other municipal parks on March 21, 2020, until October 10, 2020, with security protocols.

== Reopening ==
The park was reopened to the public on January 17, 2010. At this time, the cable car and submarine attractions were still closed.

The park has been widely criticized by the press and visitors during its reopening. Having been closed for renovations for five years, the public expected to find a completely new park, which did not materialize. On the day of the park's reopening, more than 20,000 visitors were surprised by the absence of attractions: only 18 were available. On the same day of the inauguration, the simulator was closed because the air conditioner broke down.

Facing criticism, the then Mayor Luiz Marinho proposed a project to open new attractions by the end of that year. The project, almost completed by the city government, would bring new attractions to the park by December.

The new attractions are: Minhocão (mini roller coaster), 'Splash', elevator, 'Ferrari Carousel', bumper car, 'Twist', ferris wheel, among others.

=== "Mirim Town Hall" ===
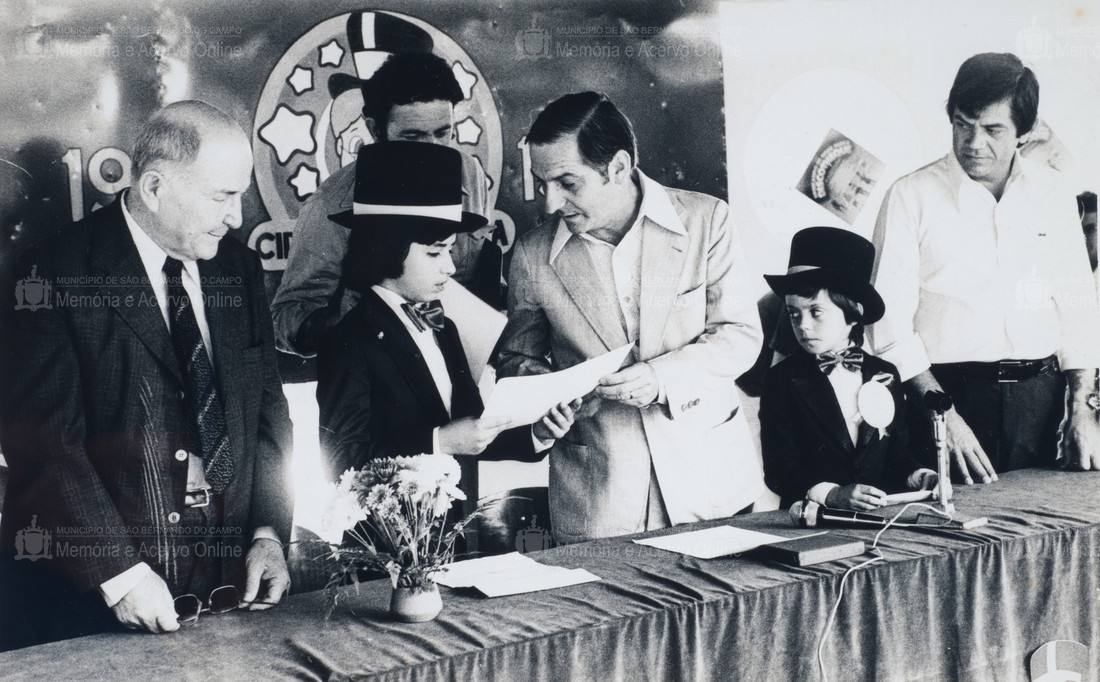
Left/right: Former Mayor Higino de Lima, Paulo P. de Brito (Mayor Mirin of 1978), Mayor Tito Costa, Marcelo Tadeu (Mayor Mirin of 1977) and Vice Mayor Mário Ladeia.

Together with the City Hall of São Bernardo do Campo, "Mayor Mirim" elections are held in the Cidade da Criança. This town hall is a project for 4th to 5th grade students elementary school (from public or private schools). When a child is elected, they will participate in the administration of the park. The mandate is voluntary and lasts for a biennium.

==== Assignments ====
The attributions of the Mayor Mirim are:

- Know, through the Department of Tourism and Events of São Bernardo do Campo, relevant actions related to the Cidade da Criança;
- Attend quarterly meetings with the staff of the São Bernardo do Campo Department of Tourism and Events and present suggestions from residents and users;
- Read and forward emails from residents and park users with proposals, suggestions and complaints about Cidade da Criança park, as briefly as possible, to the Tourism and Events Department;
- At the end of his term, present a report on his experience as Mayor Mirim of Cidade da Criança.

===== Benefits =====
The benefits are:

- The ability to invite five friends a month to the park;
- Your own institutional email;
- The possibility to accompany the Department of Tourism in events related to the park.

== Incident ==
On July 24, 2019, Ilma Pereira, who was next to her six-year-old daughter, dropped 1.5m (4,9 feet) high from the children's roller coaster "Brocumela", which reaches a maximum height of 5 meters (16 feet). According to witnesses, she would have passed out. São Paulo Fire Department and SAMU were called at 11:10 (BRT). She was referred to the Mario Covas Hospital (Santo André), with entrance at 12:30 (BRT) and the death was reported by the institution around 14:20 (BRT). According to the hospital, Ilma had cranial polytrauma. A report from the Santo André Legal Medical Institute indicates that the cause of death was head trauma. Ilma hit her head three times on the toy's support beams before falling to the floor.

In a Notice the park gave solidarity to the victim's family, which "awaits expert and medical reports to clarify the incident" and that in "50 years of history, this is the first incident recorded in the Cidade da Criança."

The police investigated whether the park had an emergency structure and according to São Bernardo do Campo's 1st DP holder, until July 25, 2019, the park had not presented a safety report. The Civil Police inspected the attraction and the City Hall of São Bernardo do Campo reported that the park had the Fire Department Surveyor to operate and it meets all operating standards. However, the park kept the roller coaster out of operation until the causes of the incident are clarified.

Ilma Pereira was veiled on July 26, 2019. Delegate Alberto José Mesquita Alves, from the 1st Police District of São Bernardo, cited the need for eventual investigation of manslaughter.
