= Wallace Cochrane Simonsen =

Brazilian banker (1884–1955)

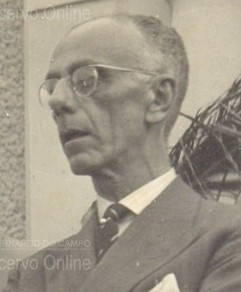

1st Mayor of São Bernardo do Campo
- In office January 1, 1945 – March 19, 1947
- Succeeded by: Tereza Delta

Personal details
- Born: May 23, 1884 Rio de Janeiro, RJ, Brazil
- Died: June 6, 1955 (aged 71) São Paulo, SP, Brazil
- Spouse: Maria Emília Moretson Simonsen
- Parents: Sidney Martin Simonsen; Robertina Cochrane Simonsen
- Occupation: Banker

Wallace Cochrane Simonsen was a Brazilian banker and the first mayor of São Bernardo do Campo, one of the cities pertaining to the Metropolitan Region of São Paulo, most specifically the ABC Region.

== Biography ==
In his early professional life, he worked as a broker in the coffee market. Eventually he founded his own bank, Banco Noroeste (later bought by Banco Santander Brasil).

In 1929, he owned a property in Vila de São Bernardo, the old name for the district located in the city of São Bernardo, which comprised the current cities of São Bernardo do Campo, São Caetano do Sul, Diadema and Santo André, although most of the government facilities were allocated in the latter one's lands. When Getúlio Vargas's intervenor (acting as Governor of São Paulo) Adhemar de Barros decided to transfer the city's seat to Santo André and downgrade São Bernardo as a mere district, a group of entrepreneurs, Wallace Simonsen leading, founded the Society of Friends of São Bernardo (Sociedade de Amigos de São Bernardo), claiming for emancipation.

The claim was successful, and in 1944 a state decree established the new city, including "do Campo" suffix to the former district denomination, and appointing Simonsen as the first mayor, which was eventually deposed by Adhemar de Barros in 1947 due to political divergencies between them, giving path to the ascension of Tereza Delta as the new mayor.

The original Simonsen's farmstead still exists, named as Woodland Farm (Chácara Silvestre) now at an avenue named after him, as a municipal heritage site.

Preceded by José de Carvalho Sobrinho as Mayor of Santo André	Mayor of São Bernardo do Campo; January 1, 1945 - March 19, 1947	Succeeded by Tereza Delta
