= Greater São Paulo =

Place in Brazil

Coordinates: 23°32′52″S 46°38′09″W

Greater São Paulo Grande São Paulo
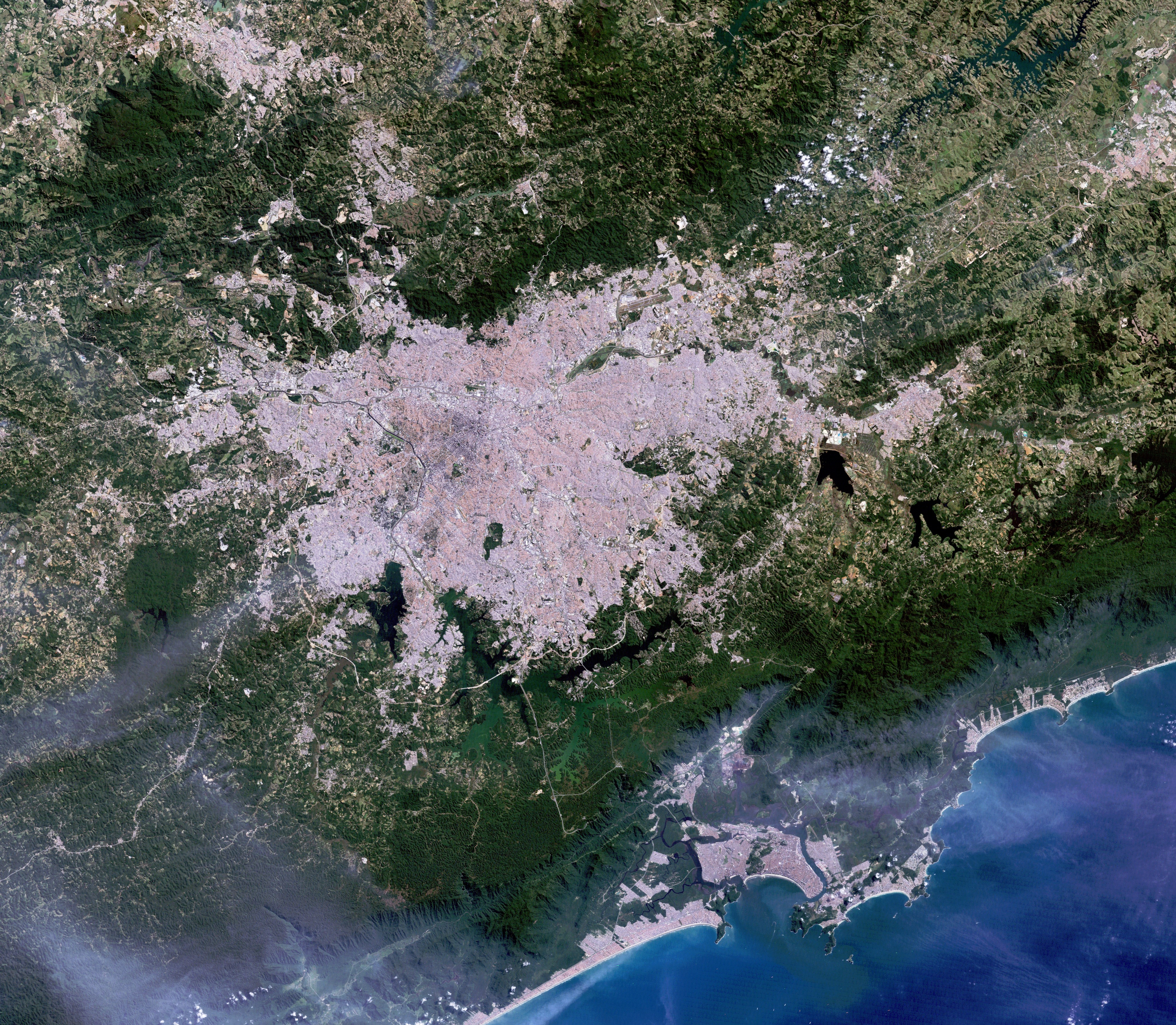
- Metropolitan Region São Paulo (RMSP) encompasses the central built up section and does not include nearby built-up areas also seen on this map, the microregions Baixada Santista (south coast), Jundiaí (north), and São José dos Campos (east), which comprise parts of its extended metro area but not the metropolitan area
- Interactive map of Greater São Paulo
- Country: Brazil
- Core city: São Paulo

Area
  - Urban: 2,139 km^{2} (826 sq mi)
  - Metro: 7,947 km^{2} (3,068 sq mi)

Population
  - Metro: 21,555,260 (1st)
  - Metro density: 2,712/km^{2} (7,025/sq mi)

GDP
  - Metro: US$ 319.3 billion (2023)
  - Per capita: US$ 14,300 (2023)

Greater São Paulo (Portuguese: Grande São Paulo) is a nonspecific term for one of the multiple definitions of the large metropolitan area located in the São Paulo state in Brazil.

== Metropolitan Area ==
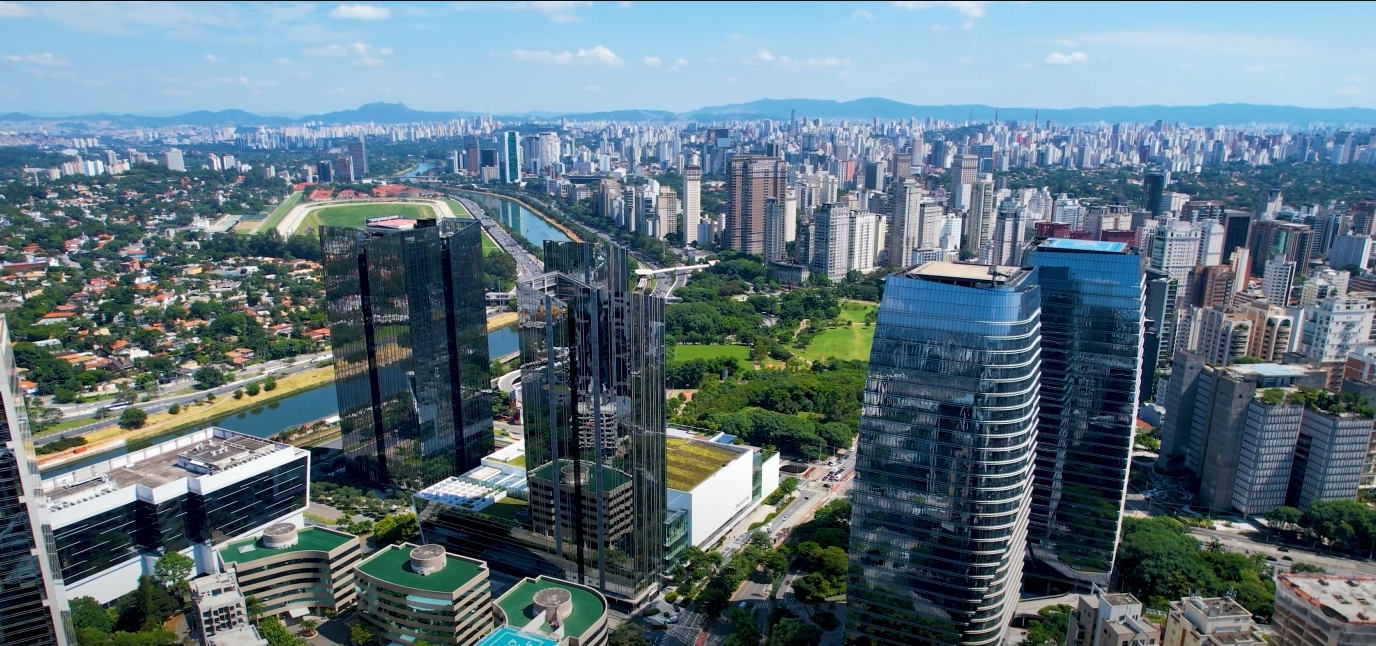
Marginal Pinheiros with modern skyscrapers

A legally defined specific term, Região Metropolitana de São Paulo (RMSP), one definition for Metropolitan São Paulo, consists of 39 municipalities, including the state capital, São Paulo.

The RMSP of São Paulo is known as a financial and economic centre of Brazil, with a total population of 21,555,260 inhabitants (2025 population estimates (Note: The population estimate for the Sao Paulo metro area was calculated by taking the list of municipalities officially considered to be in the metro area by the Brazilian government and adding each municipality's population, hence why two sources are listed here.)). The largest municipalities are São Paulo, with a population of 11,451,245, Guarulhos with a population of 1,291,784 people, plus several municipalities with more than 500,000 inhabitants, such as São Bernardo do Campo (810,729 inh.) and Santo André (748,919 inh.) in the ABC Region. The ABC Region (from Santo André, São Bernardo do Campo and São Caetano do Sul) in the south of Grande São Paulo is an important location for industrial corporations, such as Volkswagen and Ford. It represents the "core" cities of the greater region.

=== Extended Metropolitan Area ===
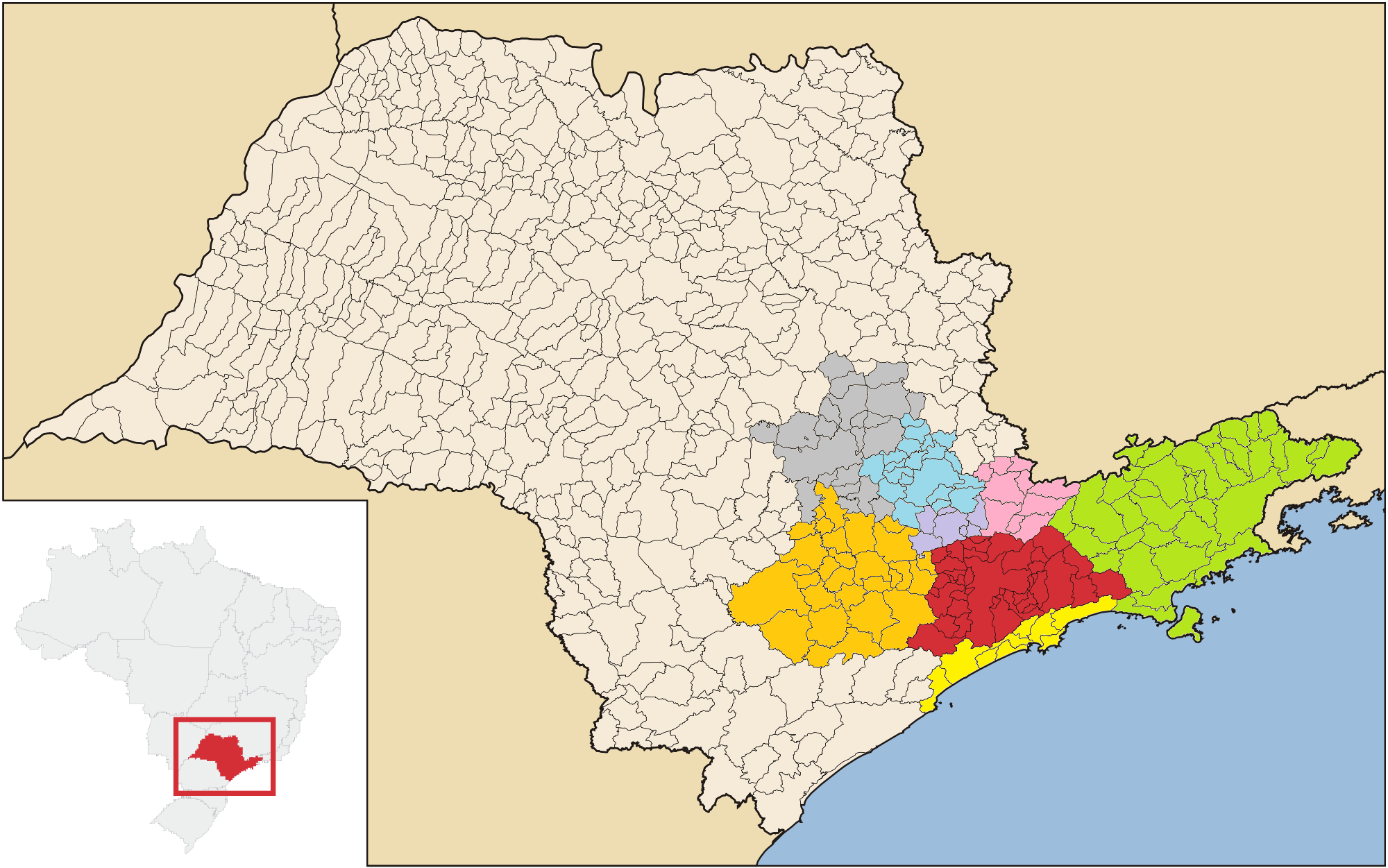
Extended Metropolitan Area in State

The extended metropolitan area of São Paulo (Complexo Metropolitano Estendido de São Paulo) is an agglomeration of five contiguous metropolitan areas that have grown into one another and three microregions, dominated by São Paulo. It has more than 33 million inhabitants, which is 75% of the population of the entire state of São Paulo, and consists of the contiguous entities:

	Region	Population	Seat city	Population
1	Metropolitan Region of São Paulo	21,860,000	São Paulo	12,310,000
2	Metropolitan Region of Campinas	3,300,000	Campinas	1,215,000
3	Metropolitan Region of Vale do Paraíba e Litoral Norte	2,550,000	São José dos Campos	725,000
4	Metropolitan Region of Sorocaba	2,150,000	Sorocaba	685,000
5	Metropolitan Region of Baixada Santista	1,880,000	Santos	435,000
6	Metropolitan Region of Piracicaba	1,500,000	Piracicaba	410,000
7	Metropolitan Region of Jundiaí	825,000	Jundiaí	425,000
8	Regional Unit of Bragança Paulista city	480,000	Bragança Paulista	170,000
São Paulo Macrometropolis			34,500,000	

== RMSP statistics ==
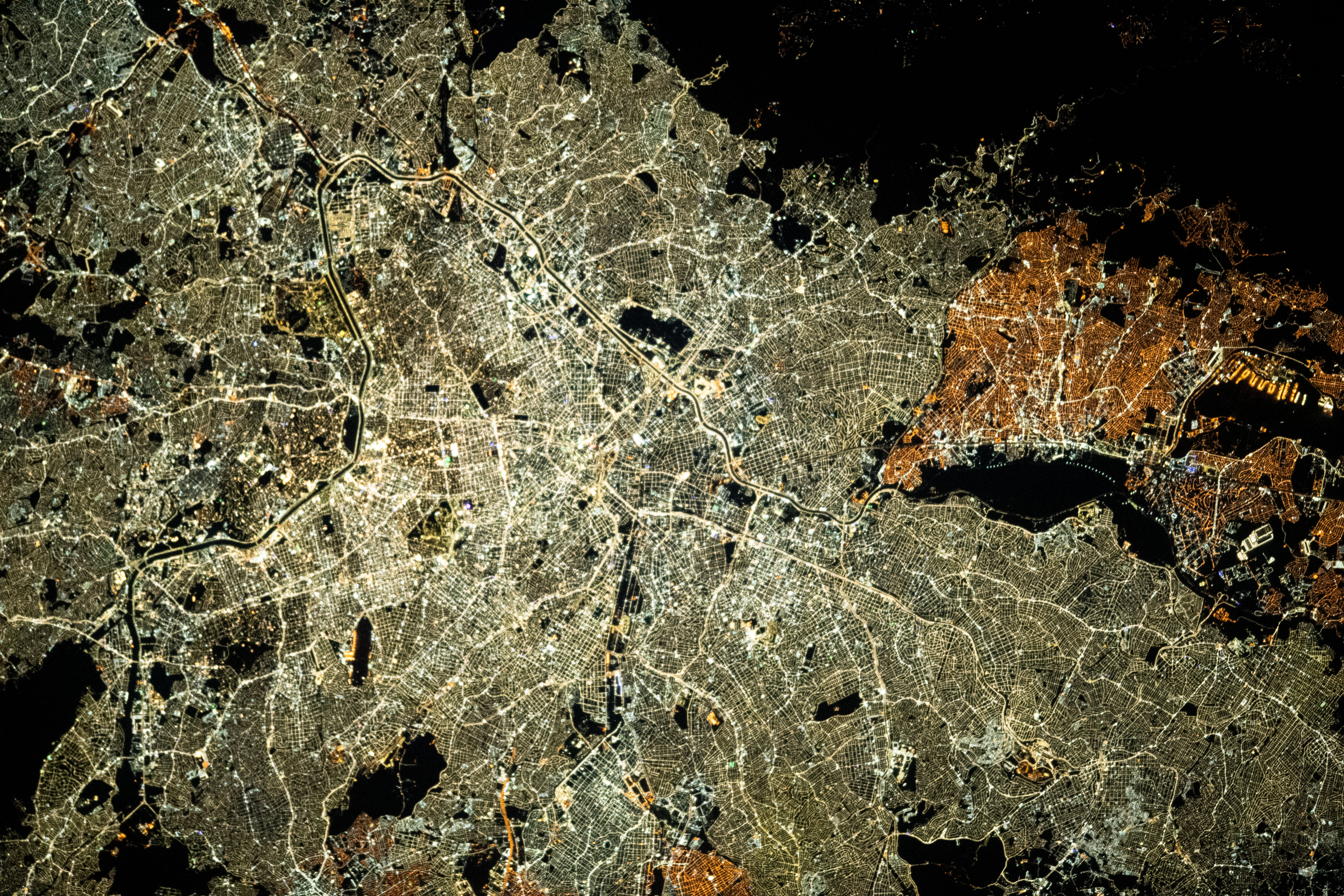
Greater São Paulo seen at night from the International Space Station

- Territorial area: 7,947 km^{2}
- Urban area: 2,139 km^{2}
- Population: 23,455,256
- GDP: R$ 1,140 trillion
- Latitude: 23 533S
- Longitude: 46 617W

== Municipalities in RMSP ==
Greater São Paulo Population Statistics by Municipality
Municipality	Area (km^{2})	1991		2000		2022		GDP (2005)
Municipality	Area (km^{2})	Census	Density (Inhab/km^{2})	Census	Density (Inhab/km^{2})	Census	Density (Inhab/km^{2})	GDP (2005)
Arujá	97	37,622	388	59,185	610	86,678	901	934,992,000
Barueri	65	130,799	2,044	208,281	3,254	316,473	4,816	22,430,475,000
Biritiba-Mirim	317	17,833	56	24,653	78	29,676	93	164,634,000
Caieiras	97	39,069	407	71,221	742	95,030	973	1,040,734,000
Cajamar	131	33,736	264	50,761	397	92,689	705	1,915,590,000
Carapicuíba	35	283,661	8,105	344,596	9,846	387,121	11,205	1,915,285,000
Cotia	324	107,453	332	148,987	460	273,640	844	3,472,181,000
Diadema	31	305,287	9,848	357,064	11,518	393,237	12,795	7,344,570,000
Embu	70	155,990	2,228	207,663	2,967	250,720	3,561	1,834,260,000
Embu-Guaçu	155	36,277	234	56,916	367	66,970	430	366,844,000
Ferraz de Vasconcelos	30	96,166	3,206	142,377	4,746	179,205	6,065	793,081,000
Francisco Morato	49	83,885	1,712	133,738	2,729	165,139	3,370	512,822,000
Franco da Rocha	133	85,535	638	108,122	807	144,849	1090	1,186,777,000
Guararema	271	17,961	66	21,904	81	31,236	115	364,164,000
Guarulhos	318	787,866	2,478	1,072,717	3,373	1,291,784	4,053	21,615,314,000
Itapevi	82	107,976	1,187	162,433	1,785	232,513	2,812	1,809,328,000
Itapecerica da Serra	151	85,640	567	129,685	859	158,522	1,052	1,925,151,000
Itaquaquecetuba	82	164,957	2,012	272,942	3,329	369,275	4,469	1,733,662,000
Jandira	18	62,697	3,483	91,807	5,100	118,045	6,765	1,091,263,000
Juquitiba	522	19,969	38	26,459	51	27,404	52	176,268,000
Mairiporã	321	39,937	124	60,111	187	93,617	291	606,428,000
Mauá	62	294,998	4,758	363,392	5,861	418,261	6,753	4,861,255,000
Mogi das Cruzes	712	273,175	384	330,241	464	449,955	631	4,425,513,000
Osasco	65	568,225	8,742	652,593	10,040	743,432	11,445	18,310,452,000
Pirapora do Bom Jesus	108	7,956	74	12,395	115	18,370	169	110,396,000
Poá	17	76,302	4,488	95,801	5,635	103,765	6,010	1,459,161,000
Ribeirão Pires	99	85,085	859	104,508	1,056	115,559	1,167	1,141,011,000
Rio Grande da Serra	36	29,901	808	37,091	1,002	44,170	1,215	239,390,000
Salesópolis	426	11,359	27	14,357	34	15,202	35	137,580,000
Santa Isabel	363	37,975	105	43,740	121	53,174	146	359,216,000
Santana de Parnaíba	179	37,762	205	74,828	407	154,105	856	2,245,994,000
Santo André	175	616,991	3,526	649,331	3,710	748,919	4,260	11,426,975,000
São Bernardo do Campo	406	566,893	1,396	703,177	1,732	810,729	1,979	19,446,018,000
São Caetano do Sul	15	149,519	9,968	140,159	9,344	165,655	10,805	8,003,490,000
São Lourenço da Serra	187	7,506	40	12,199	65	15,984	85	120,750,000
São Paulo	1,521	9,646,185	6,334	10,434,252	6,851	11,451,245	7,527	263,177,148,000
Suzano	206	158,839	771	228,690	1,110	307,364	1,490	4,289,553,000
Taboão da Serra	20	160,084	8,004	197,644	9,882	273,542	13,416	3,089,793,000
Vargem Grande Paulista	42	15,870	467	32,683	961	50,333	1,184	421,724,000
Total	7,943	15,230,140	1,917	17,614,036	2,218	20,743,587	2,610	416,499,242,000

== Transport ==
Being the most industrialized region of the country as well as the most populated, the transportation plays an important role. The main highways (rodovias) of the area are:

- Rodovia Anhanguera
- Rodovia dos Imigrantes
- Rodovia Anchieta
- Rodovia dos Bandeirantes
- Rodovia Presidente Dutra
- Rodovia Ayrton Senna
- Rodovia Castelo Branco
- Rodovia Fernão Dias
- Rodovia Raposo Tavares
- Rodovia Régis Bittencourt
- Rodoanel Mário Covas

The São Paulo Metro and the Companhia Paulista de Trens Metropolitanos provide rail-based transit within the metropolitan area.
