= 123 Importados =

Brazilian fraudulent online store

123importados.com
- Website type: Online store
- Headquarters: São Paulo, {{{location_country}}}
- Owner: Online Intermediações LTDA
- Industry: E-commerce
- Website: 123importados.com (archived in April 2020)
- Launched: January or February 2020
- Current status: Defunct

123 Importados was an online store headquartered in São Paulo, Brazil, that claimed to sell electronics and appliances but was later identified as an online fraud. On June 30, 2020, eight suspects involved in 123 Importados were arrested.

== Description ==
123 Importados, operating at the web address 123importados.com, was an online store offering electronics and appliances, mainly televisions, computers, and refrigerators, at prices well below market value. For example, an Electrolux refrigerator was listed on the site for 1,000 Brazilian reais, while its average price was around 2,800 reais in other stores. The only payment option was via bank slip, and delivery times could extend up to ninety days.

== History ==
=== Background ===
According to an investigation by the São Paulo Civil Police, the group behind 123 Importados committed bank loan fraud in 2019. The investigations began in November of that year; members were arrested for money laundering through loans and other operations using shell companies. Five people were arrested, and fifty vehicles purchased with the proceeds of the fraud were seized.

=== Launch and public reaction ===
On December 17, the domain 123importados.com was registered. On January 7, Online Intermediações LTDA was registered as a legal entity, with an address in a building that rents meeting rooms. The company was established with a capital of 1,000 Brazilian reais, (Note: Later sources showed the company had a capital of 500,000 reais.) and the shareholder was Felipe Inocêncio da Silva, convicted of drug trafficking and related crimes in 2009. 123 Importados claimed that the website started operating in January 2020; according to a report by Netcraft, the site was first seen online in February 2020.

123 Importados started advertising on major TV channels and newspapers, such as Band and RedeTV!, which, according to consumers, gave the store credibility. After this, several websites pointed out that the store was likely a scam. The main factors raising suspicion were the long delivery time, the payment method (bank slip only), and the extremely low prices. The website was exposed by the Patrulha do Consumidor segment, hosted by Celso Russomanno, on the program Cidade Alerta. On June 13, Russomanno tried to contact the owner of 123 Importados live on air, but when that failed, he called the owner's wife, who began to curse at him. The site was taken offline during the program, with messages directed at Russomanno being posted.

=== Investigation ===
On June 30, 2020, the police launched an operation in Jaú, Mauá, and São Paulo against the group suspected of perpetrating the fraud, executing eight arrest warrants and twelve search and seizure warrants. The suspects were taken to the headquarters of the State Department of Criminal Investigations (Deic). A Jaguar SUV valued at 500,000 reais was seized. On July 6, the Civil Police arrested a man in Jaú attempting to reorganize the group. He was charged with fraud and criminal association, becoming the ninth person arrested in connection with the scheme.

123 Importados scammed over 10,000 people in Brazil, and according to the Civil Police investigation, the group's estimated damage could reach 10 million reais.
