= SP29 =

SP29 may refer to:

- Madrid Autonomous Community FIPS region code

SP-29 may refer to:

- SP-29 (Brazil), a State highway in Brazil
- USS Patrol No. 5 (SP-29), an armed motorboat that served in the United States Navy as a patrol vessel from 1917 to 1919
