= SP-29 (São Paulo highway) =

State highway in São Paulo, Brazil

Rodovia Coronel PM Nelson Tranchesi
- Estrada da Roselândia (Portuguese)

Route information
- Maintained by EcoVias Raposo-Castello
- Length: 12 km (7.5 mi)

Major junctions
- South end: Cotia
- Raposo Tavares; SP-274; Castello Branco
- North end: Itapevi next to Jandira

Location
- Country: Brazil
- State: São Paulo

Highway system
- Highways in Brazil; Federal

SP-29 is a state highway in the state of São Paulo in Brazil.

== Description ==
The Coronel PM Nelson Tranchesi Highway, also known as the Estrada da Roselândia, is a single-lane road in both directions with a total length of approximately 12 km. It connects the Rodovia Raposo Tavares (at km 32.5) to the Rodovia Castello Branco (at km 32), passing through the municipalities of Cotia and Itapevi, where part of the route functions as a local urban avenue.

The road is managed by the EcoRodovias (EcoVias Raposo Castello), which provides towing services, mechanical assistance, medical rescue, and real-time traffic imagery on its official website.

== See also ==
- Highway system of São Paulo
- Brazilian Highway System
