= Rodoanel Mário Covas =

Highway in São Paulo

SP-021 Rodoanel Mário Covas
- Via Perimetral Metropolitana (until 1990); Rodoanel Metropolitano de São Paulo (until 2001)
- Rodoanel Mário Covas and its four sections. The west (purple), south (green) and east (yellow) sections are already completed. The municipality of São Paulo is highlighted in white.

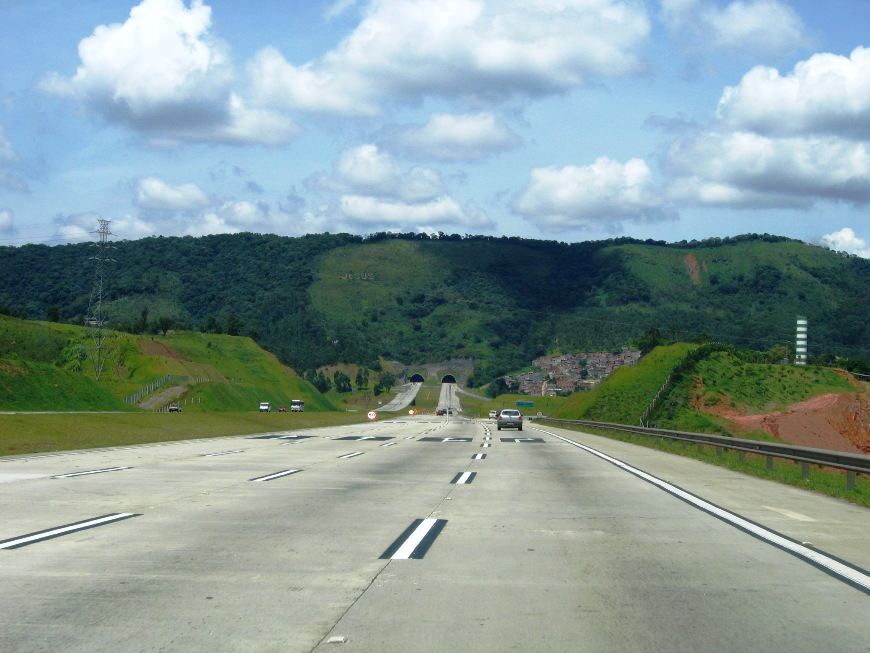
- A view of the highway with the entrance to the first tunnels

Route information
- Maintained by RodoAnel (CCR) - Dersa (in the West Segment since 2008) and SPMar (Bertin) (in the South and East Segments since 2011)
- Length: 177 km (110 mi) 132.5 km (82.3 mi) completed until now.
- Existed: 2002 (West Segment); 2010 (South Segment); 2014 (East Segment); 2026 (North Segment)–present

Major junctions
- Beltway around São Paulo, Brazil
- West end: Av. Raimundo P. Magalhães; Perus, São Paulo, SP
- Bandeirantes; Anhangüera; Castelo Branco; Raposo Tavares; Régis Bittencourt; Imigrantes; Anchieta; Jacu Pêssego; Henrique Eroles; Ayrton Senna; Dutra; Hélio Smidt; Fernão Dias
- East end: Rodovia Presidente Dutra; Arujá, SP

Location
- Country: Brazil
- State: São Paulo

Highway system
- Highways in Brazil; Federal; São Paulo State Highways

The Rodoanel Mário Covas (official designation SP-021) is the planned (and partially built) beltway of the Greater São Paulo, Brazil. Upon its completion, it will have a length of 177 km (110 mi), with a radius of about 23 km (14 mi) from the geographical center of the city. It was named after Mário Covas, who was mayor of the city of São Paulo (1983–1985) and a state governor (1994-1998/1998-2001) until his death from cancer. It is a controlled access highway with a speed limit of 100 km/h (62 mph) under normal weather and traffic circumstances.

== History ==
The first section was inaugurated in October 2002, starting at the Estrada Velha de Campinas (lit. Old Road of Campinas), in the northern part of São Paulo, and ending at the Régis Bittencourt highway, in Embu, covering 32 km (20 mi). It crosses Anhanguera, Bandeirantes, Castelo Branco, and Raposo Tavares highways. There are urban accesses to the cities of Osasco and Carapicuíba, but it also crosses through the municipalities of Barueri, Santana de Parnaíba, Embu, Cotia, and São Paulo. The current segment has three tunnels, one of them being the largest and widest one in Brazil, with 1.6 km (0.99 mi), 62 viaducts and six bridges.

On September 15, 2006, the State Government announced the start of the construction of the South Segment, which would link the west segment to the Anchieta and Imigrantes highways and ending in Papa João XXIII Avenue in Mauá. It would serve as a corridor for more than 250,000 trucks per month which must go through the city of São Paulo in order to interconnect to or from the city port of Santos, which is accessible via the two highways cited above. During the construction, a major accident happened when three recently installed ledges fell on the Régis Bittencourt highway, hitting three cars and injuring three people. The construction was expected to take almost five years, mainly due to the complex urban zones and difficult terrain it would cross (including a series of artificial lakes and dams and a mountainous region), but it ended up being inaugurated in April 2010, although some sections were missing guard rails and proper traffic signs.

Upon its completion, estimated for 2026, it will have interconnected the Fernão Dias (in the North Segment), Presidente Dutra (opened in 2015) and Ayrton Senna (opened in 2015) East Segment main highways, besides many other smaller ones.

== Importance ==
The São Paulo Beltway is considered a major strategic investment for the efficiency of road transportation in the economically most important region of the country. São Paulo is a megacity, with a population in excess of 20 million inhabitants, and more than 6 million vehicles. Most of the cargo transported by road or other modalities back and forth from the port of Santos today pass through the city of São Paulo generating incredible traffic jams at all hours of the day, with a loss of more than 1.7 billion hours per year (more than 25 million trips a day). Although the city already has an inner beltway (called the Marginals, see Marginal Pinheiros and Marginal Tietê), it is over 30 years old and its capacity is completely saturated since (up until the construction of the Rodoanel) it is the only connection between the major highways around the city of São Paulo. It has been estimated already that more than 30% of the Marginal's traffic was relieved as a consequence.

A recent study, however, has shown that the impact of the Rodoanel in the traffic of São Paulo will quickly diminish, since the number of new cars sold in the city breaks records successively and will quickly compensate for the absence of trucks in the city.

The importance of the Beltway is underlined by popular approval, with June 2004 showing 85% approval rates, 86% of users deeming it a very important resource, and 80% of positive aspects. More than 300,000 vehicles (78% of them automobiles) use the Beltway every day. The system has an estimated peak capacity of 700,000 vehicles per day.

== Management ==
The Western section, completed in 2002, is a toll road managed by a private group called CCR. The Southern section (opened in 2010) is managed by SEMPER, who won the public tender to manage, collect tolls and also to build and collect tolls on the recently finished Eastern section.

== Tolls ==
CCR RodoAnel has 13 toll plazas installed by the extension of the western section of the Mário Covas ring road, and the collection of the fare is only carried out once every trip at the exits of the highway. The values are adjusted annually in July based on the variation of the Extended National Consumer Price Index (IPCA), as established in a contract with the Government of the State of São Paulo.

The payment of the toll is reversed in investment in works on the roads and the collection of taxes on the tariff is destined to the municipalities cut by the highway. In 2012, CCR RodoAnel made a transfer of R $9 million to the 7 municipalities through which the highway passes.

== See also ==
- Highway system of São Paulo
