= Salvador Arena =

Brazilian businessman

- Born: January 12, 1915; Tripoli, Libya
- Died: January 28, 1998 (aged 83); São Bernardo do Campo, Brazil
- Education: Escola Politécnica da USP
- Years active: 1936–1998
- Known for: founding Termomecanica.
- Parents: Nicola Arena (father); Giuditta Patessio Arena (mother)
- Website: www.fundacaosalvadorarena.org.br

Salvatore Arena (known as Salvador Arena, January 12, 1915 – January 28, 1998) was an Italian-Brazilian businessman. He was the founder of Termomecanica São Paulo and the Salvador Arena Foundation.

== Biography ==
=== Youth & education ===
Born in Tripoli, Libya, his parents were Nicola Arena, natural from Sicilia and Giuditta Patessio Arena, natural from Veneza. Having a humble background, his father processed metals in a workshop on the property and, wanting to help with the family's income, at the age of eight he started making candles.

Salvador Arena arrived in Brazil in 1920 at the age of 5, settling with the family in the city of São Paulo in the Vila Prudente and was illiterate until he was 7 years old. However, when a priest visited his house, he noticed his ease with the letters and convinced his mother to enroll him in Catholic education when he was 10 years old. Graduated at the age of 21 from the Escola Politécnica da USP.

=== Career ===
==== Light ====
In 1937 he started at Light, being influenced by the engineer Billings where he got involved in the Cubatão Hydroelectric Power Plant project. During his time at Light, Arena also worked as an industrial parts designer. His time at Light also influenced his choice of employees and the development of his didactics, by liking to help others to progress.

==== Termomecanica ====
After several years in Light, without a dazzle of evolution and inspired by working with his father on metal selling, he came to resign. In 1942, with US$200 that he had received from the company, he founded Termomecanica São Paulo SA, which started in Mooca, manufacturing the first electric bakery ovens in Brazil, subsequently achieving success on the market with the recycling of non-ferrous scrap metals with its greatest creation being the production of the bronze alloy TM 23, which until today is one of the most used in the Brazilian industry.

At the end of World War II, Arena multiplied the capacity of its company by buying second-hand equipment from the US. In 1950, he created a continuous casting process.

In 1957, he became a naturalized Brazilian. In the district of Rudge Ramos, São Bernardo do Campo, was the place where, in the 50's, he started the manufacture of its new factory, which came to focus on the diversified production of non-ferrous metals. For the transition of the country's economy from agricultural to industrial, this was a very promising time. The rapid and disorderly development of the region in São Bernardo do Campo caused the appearance of several favelas and, after studying the conditions in which these people lived (mainly suffering from malnutrition), he began to hold the free lunch, the sending of end of year gifts, school uniforms and later these social works centered on the Salvador Arena Foundation, founded in 1964. As an employer, Salvador offered basic food basket, medical care, an additional year-end supplement even before the thirteenth salary was created, and also granted profit sharing. Due to his wage policies and aversion to the state monopoly, Arena was seen as a socialist, or as Jorge Andrade said: "an open liberal who became a millionaire in capitalism".

In the 60's, Termomecanica was responsible for building bodies of the rockets for the CTA, wheel hubs for the Buffalo airplanes, which served isolated communities in the Amazon and in the 90's was involved in the production of the Piranha missile, the first air-to-air missile built in a third world country.

Being innovative, Arena has become one of the richest entrepreneurs in the country. Having fought for a change in the Brazilian teaching method, developed suggestions that were not accepted by the government because of the high investment required. He founded the Colégio Termomecanica in 1989, which uses his teaching method developed in the 1970s, that had been refused by the Brazilian and British government. The school has become an educational symbol in São Bernardo do Campo. According to the 2010 and 2011 ENEM, the school ranks first in teaching quality in the great ABC.

As a professional, Arena was influenced by Henry Ford and used to dedicate hours to an idea and was extremely active in his factory, controlling resources to avoid waste, besides always being the first to arrive and the last to leave. In his quest to avoid waste and reduce costs, he reused discarded machines and refurbished them so that they had an efficiency comparable to state-of-the-art machines. He also operated his business in his own way and was an open critic against the government, even in the Brazilian military dictatorship, and in 1987 he even took a strike against the "political and economic trickery of the country". Arena was also accurate in paying taxes and trained his own staff to ascend to management positions. Its wage policy, which aimed at improving the living conditions of its workers, went against the dictatorship's policy of accumulating capital.

=== Personal life ===
Arena was a sportsman who neither smoked nor drank and although he got married, he didn't have children, because he didn't want to see them fighting for their inheritance. In soccer, he cheered for the Palestra for his lifetime.

=== Death & legacy ===
Salvador Arena died on January 28, 1998, due to a heart attack, in his home. In his will, he placed the Salvador Arena Foundation as heir to his fortune valued at 800 million dollars, who is the heir to his legacy and should use the resources to "solve the problems of education and assistance and protection of those in need". His Foundation also distributes basic food baskets at ABC Paulista, free medical care, among other things.

== See also ==
- Colégio Termomecanica
- Centro Educacional da Fundação Salvador Arena
- Faculdade de Tecnologia Termomecanica

== Bibliography ==
- Alves, Francisca Stella Fagá (2000). Salvador Arena (PDF) (in Brazilian Portuguese) (1 ed.). Dórea Books and Art. p. 119. ISBN 857234145-5. Archived from the original (PDF) on 2009-02-19.
