= Rodovia Anchieta =

São Paulo state highway

Coordinates: 23°47′22″S 46°31′10″W

SP-150
- Rodovia Anchieta
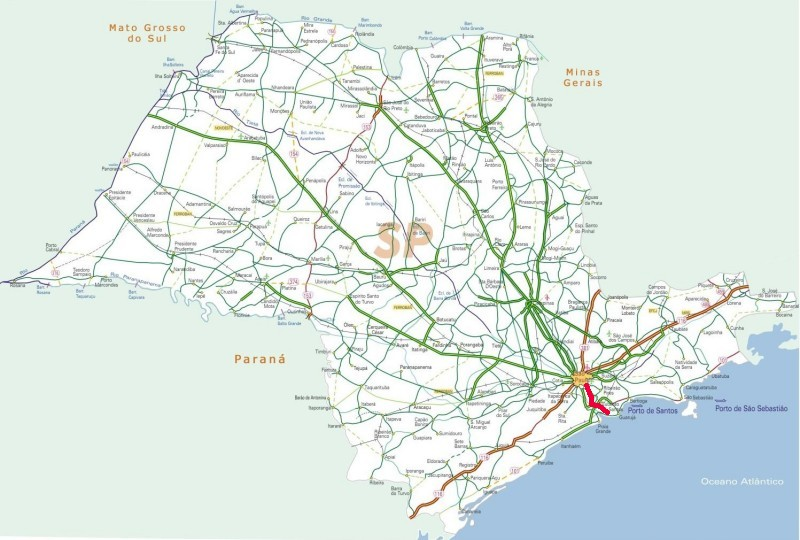
- Map of the itinerary of Anchieta Highway (in red)

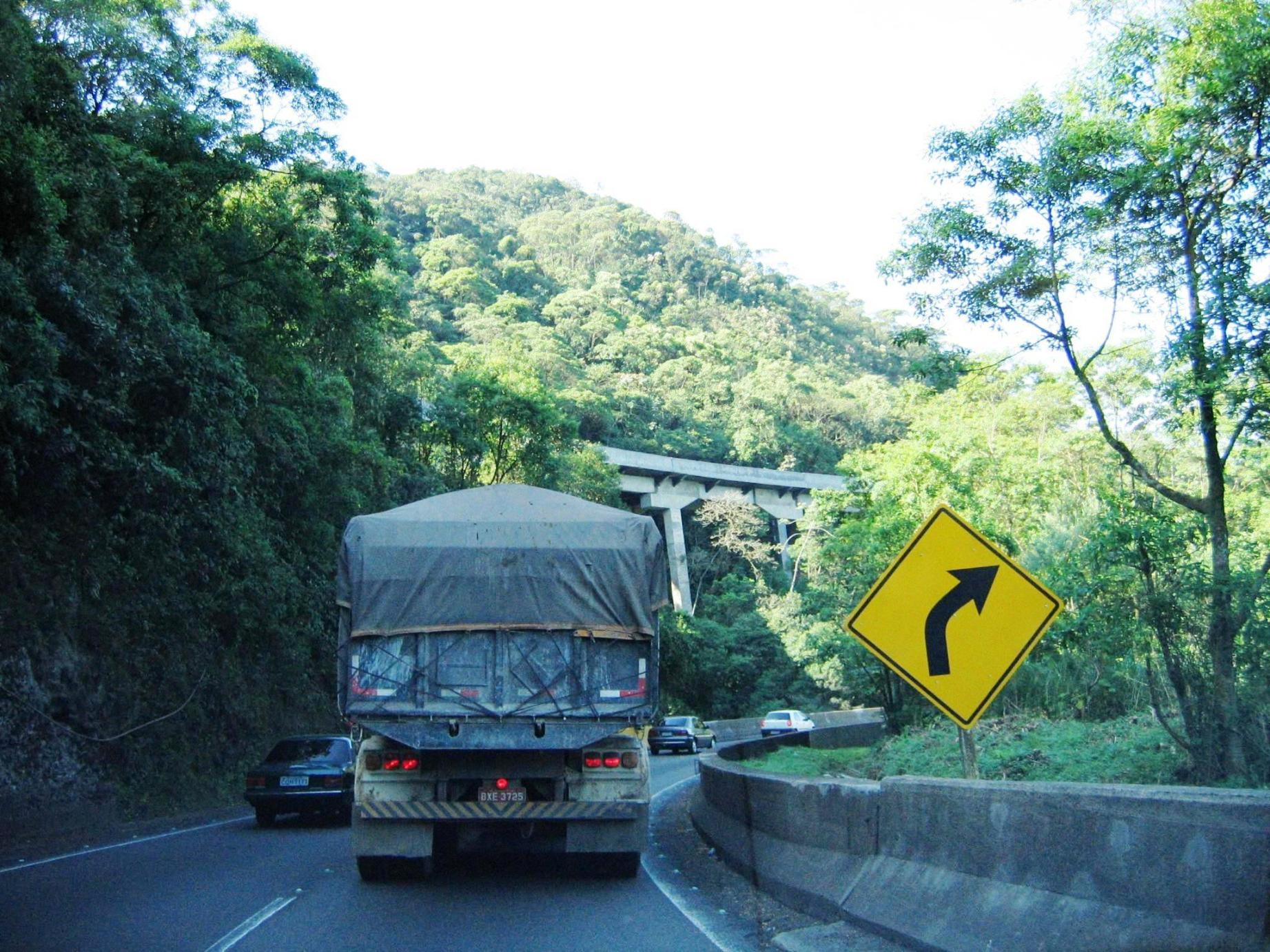
- Rodovia Anchieta

Route information
- Maintained by Ecovias
- Length: 72 km (45 mi)
- Existed: 22 April 1947; 78 years ago (north lane); 9 July 1953; 72 years ago (south lane)–present

Major junctions
- North end: Rua das Juntas Provisórias in São Paulo, SP
- Rodoanel; Rodovia Caminho do Mar (SP-148); Interligação Planalto (SP-41); Padre M. da Nóbrega (SP-55); Interligação Planície (SP-59)
- South end: Avenida Martins Fontes in Santos, SP

Location
- Country: Brazil
- State: São Paulo

Highway system
- Highways in Brazil; Federal; São Paulo State Highways

The Rodovia Anchieta (Anchieta Highway, official designation SP-150) is a highway connection between São Paulo and the Atlantic coast, the cities of Cubatão and Santos, in Brazil. In the plateau, the highway serves several cities of Greater São Paulo, such as São Bernardo do Campo, São Caetano do Sul, Santo André and Riacho Grande and traverses a picturesque region of dams and rain forests.

The Rodovia Anchieta is a major pride of the Brazilian engineering, because it was built with a great number of bridges and tunnels along the steep cliffs of the Serra do Mar; and the first modern, concrete-paved road built in São Paulo in the 1930s. Its north lane was inaugurated on Tuesday, 22 April 1947, and its south on Thursday, 9 July 1953.

The highway is one of the busiest of the country, because of the movement of goods to and from Santos's seaport. Traffic problems are common, mainly if there is bad weather or in long weekends when many families living in São Paulo go to Santos or Guarujá beaches. The Rodovia Anchieta is approximately 60 km long.

It is named after the Jesuit priest, Father José de Anchieta, who often called the trail "the worst trail in the world" it was given this nickname because it badly hurt his feet when he would walk the trail. It connected to the city of São Vicente by the sea with the village he helped to found in the high plateau, São Paulo dos Campos de Piratininga, in 1554.

The highway is managed by a state concession to the private company Ecovias, and therefore is a toll road.

The two carriageways of the Rodovia Anchieta are both fully reversible. Traffic is managed to flow either bidirectionally (uphill on one carriageway and downhill on the other) or unidirectionally (uphill or downhill on both carriageways), depending on demand. In the unidirectional mode, the opposing traffic is diverted to the Rodovia dos Imigrantes.

== See also ==
- Highway system of São Paulo
- Brazilian Highway System
