= EcoRodovias =

Transportation company in Brazil

EcoRodovias Infraestrutura e Logística S.A.
- Company type: Sociedade Anônima
- Traded as: B3: ECOR3; Ibovespa Component
- Industry: Transportation
- Founded: 2003
- Headquarters: São Paulo, Brazil
- Key people: Marcos Antônio Cassou, (Chairman); Marcelino Rafart de Seras, (CEO)
- Products: Administration of highways Logistics; Toll Road port and airports operations
- Revenue: ▲US$ 788.7 million (2017)
- Net income: ▲US$ 120.7 million (2017)
- Number of employees: 2,028
- Website: ecorodovias.com.br

EcoRodovias is a Brazilian transportation company mainly focused on highway concessions and associated services. It is one of the largest transportation Company in Latin America.

== History ==
In December 2015, Gruppo Gavio bought 41% of EcoRodovias from the Almeida family for US$541 million.

== Description ==
Currently the company has six highway concessions, 14 logistics units and a port terminal. It is Brazil's second-largest operator of toll roads.

The company's major shareholder is the Brazilian conglomerate CR Almeida And Apoquindo Capital a Chilean fund manager is one of the minority shareholders. The EcoRodovias main competitors are CCR and Arteris.
