= Rodovia Raposo Tavares =

Highway in São Paulo, Brazil

SP-270 Rodovia Raposo Tavares
- Rodovia São Paulo-Paraná (until 1954); Via Adhemar (until 1954)
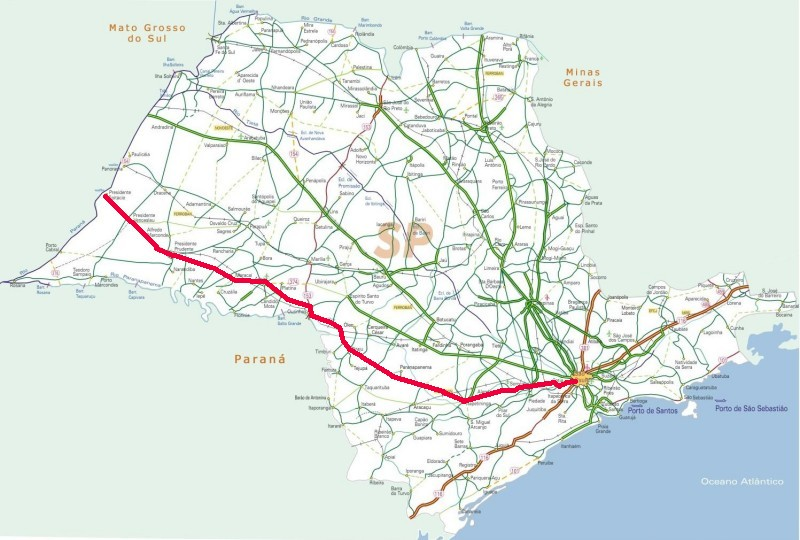
- Map of the itinerary of Raposo Tavares Highway (in red)

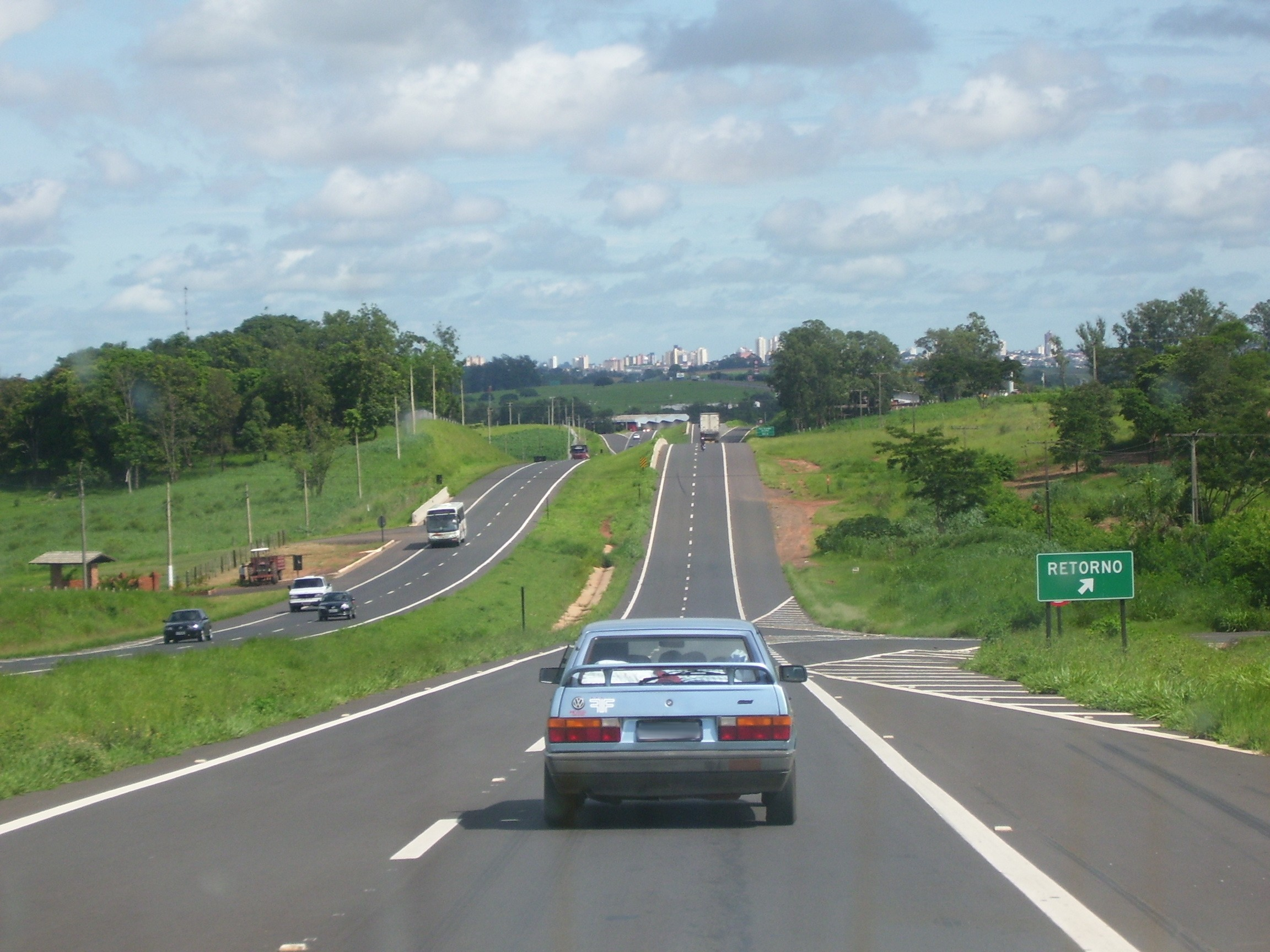
- View of the Highway

Route information
- Maintained by Viaoeste (CCR), SPVias (CCR), DER and CART
- Length: 654 km (406 mi)
- Status: Open
- Existed: 1937–present

Major junctions
- West end: BR-267 in Presidente Epitácio, SP
- SP-21; SP-29; SP-250; SP-274; SP-75; SP-141; SP-127; SP-266; SP-268; SP-255; SP-261; SP-287; BR-153; SP-327; SP-333; SP-284; SP-457; SP-425; SP-501; SP-563
- East end: Rua Reação in Butantã, São Paulo, SP

Location
- Country: Brazil
- State: São Paulo

Highway system
- Highways in Brazil; Federal; São Paulo State Highways

Rodovia Raposo Tavares (official designation SP-270) is the longest highway in the state of São Paulo, Brazil, with 654 km (406 mi). It was opened in 1937.

The highway starts in the city of São Paulo and continues westward, serving the main cities of Osasco, Cotia, Vargem Grande Paulista, São Roque, Sorocaba, Itapetininga, Angatuba, Ourinhos, Assis, Presidente Prudente, Presidente Bernardes, Presidente Venceslau and Presidente Epitácio, at the shores of the Paraná River, by the border with Mato Grosso do Sul. It receives the Castelo Branco Highway at Ourinhos. The highway was named in honour of António Raposo Tavares, one of the leading bandeirantes (explorers of the backlands in the 16th and 17th centuries). It is managed and maintained in its first 120 km (75 mi) by a state concession to private company ViaOeste, and this section requires a toll. The remainder of the highway is maintained by the State of São Paulo's Department of Roads (DER).

== See also ==
- Highway system of São Paulo
- Brazilian Highway System
