= Mauá =

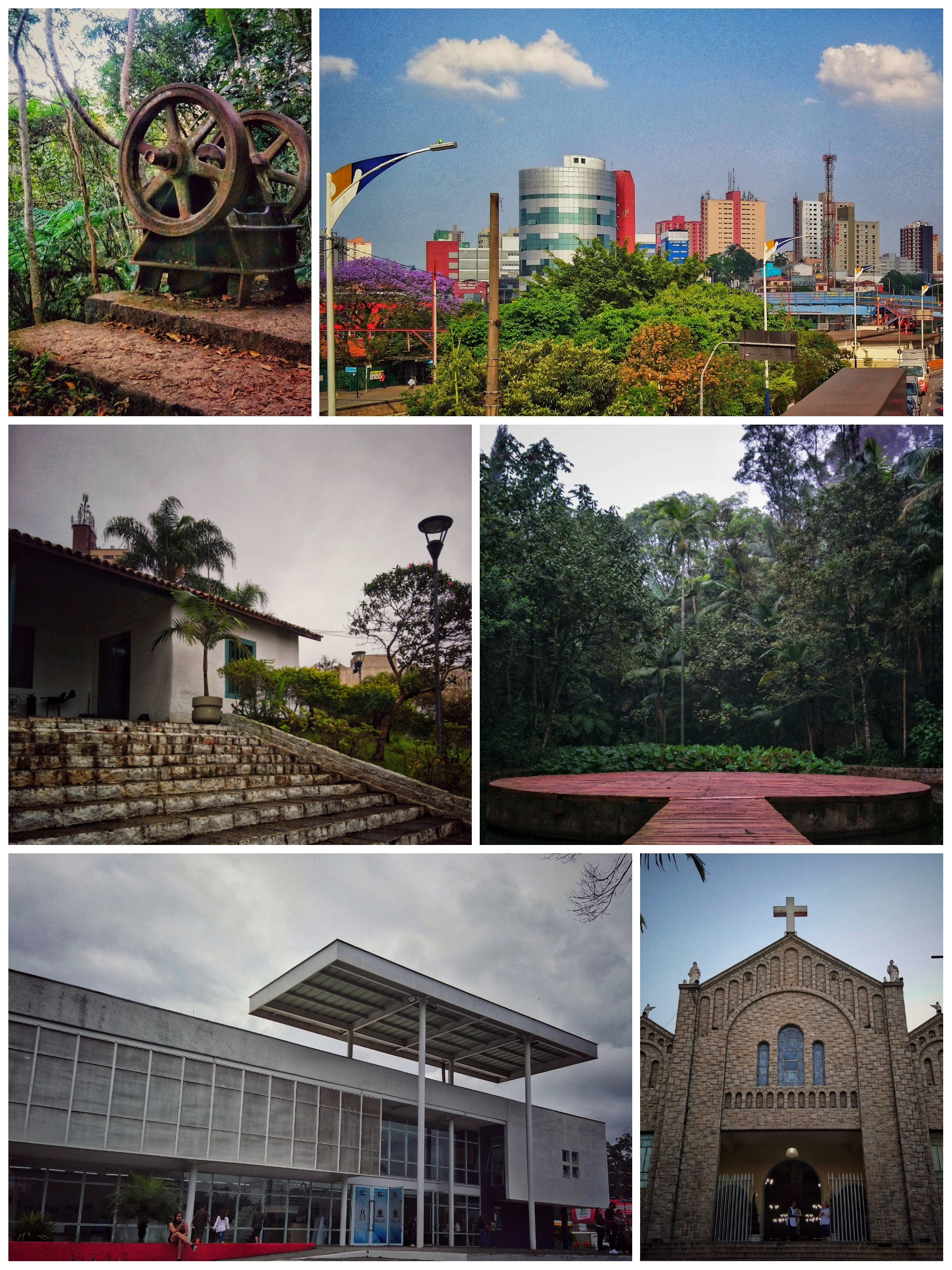
- From above, clockwise: Santa Luzia Cave Ecological Park; partial view of the city center from the Matriz neighborhood; Baron of Mauá Museum; Guapituba Ecological Park Alfredo Klinkert Junior; Anselmo Haraldt Walendy Municipal Theater and Church of the Immaculate Conception of Mauá in the Matrix.

- Flag Coat of arms
- Nickname: Capital da Porcelana (The capital of porcelain)
- Motto(s): "Capital da Louça e da cerâmica" ("Capital of Crockery and Pottery")
- Location of Mauá

- Location in Brazil
- Coordinates: 23°40′04″S 46°27′39″W
- Country: Brazil
- Region: Southeast
- State: São Paulo
- Founded: January 1, 1954

Government
  - Mayor: Francisco Marcelo Oliveira (PT)

Area
  - Total: 62.293 km^{2} (24.051 sq mi)
- Elevation: 818 m (2,684 ft)

Population (2022)
  - Total: 418,261
  - Estimate (2025): 429,014
  - Density: 6,714.4/km^{2} (17,390/sq mi)
- Time zone: UTC−3 (UTC−3)
  - Summer (DST): UTC−2 (UTC−2)
- Postal code: 09300-000
- Area code: +55 11
- Demonym: mauaense
- Website: Mauá, São Paulo

Mauá (Portuguese pronunciation: [maˈwa]) is a municipality in the state of São Paulo, in Brazil. It is part of the metropolitan region of São Paulo. The population as of 2020 is 477,552 inhabitants (11th largest city in population number of the state), the density is 7,500 per square kilometre (19,000/sq mi) and the area is 62.6 square kilometres (24.2 sq mi). The density is in fact bigger, since one third of the city is occupied by industries and 10% is countryside or forest. Its name comes from the Tupi language and means the one that is high. As it is a municipality, it can also be translated as high city. However, back when the city was a small village, its name was Pilar, then the name was changed in 1934 into Mauá as a homage to Visconde de Mauá, entrepreneur which built the Santos–Jundiaí railway that passes through the city.

Mauá has the 23rd largest GDP of São Paulo state.

It is the birthplace of Brazilian tableware industry.

== Economy ==
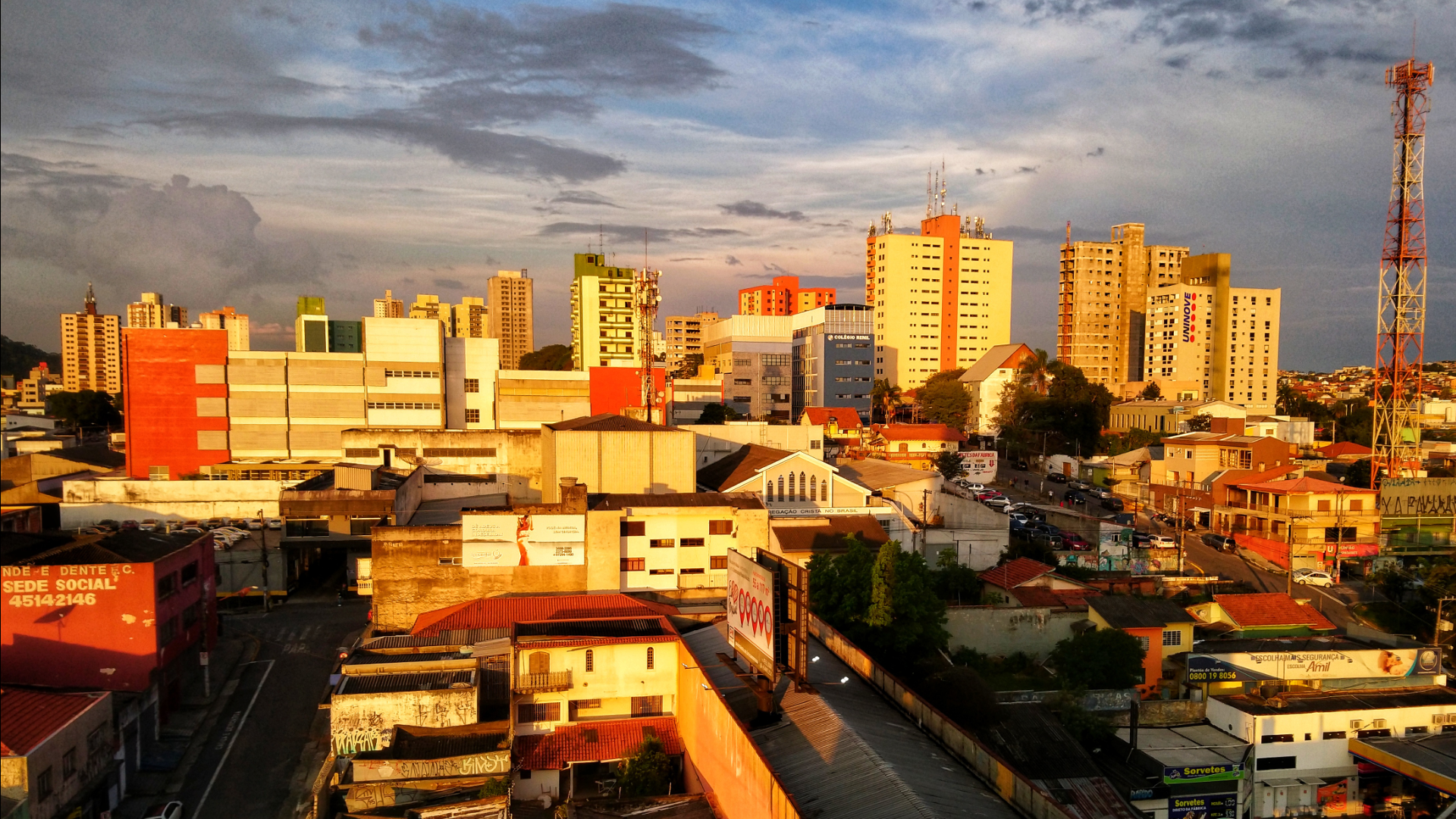

Although there are various types of economic activity in the city (logistics, metallurgy, chemical and electrical materials, and petrochemical), Mauá is still known as the "capital of china and pottery", because this activity was very important for the development of the municipality. There are two industrial centers (Capuava and Sertãozinho) and a large petrochemical complex plant where the refinery of Petrobras is located, the RECAP. These poles transformed Mauá into one of the largest industrial parks in the country. Major road interventions are being implemented (the Mário Covas Beltway and the prolongation of the Avenue Jacu-Pêssego/Nova Trabalhadores), which, due to the improved access to the city should influence the growth of industrial activity, who nowadays suffers with the bottleneck of the road network and its chronic lack of maintenance.

Some companies with headquarters or branches in the municipality of Mauá: ALCAN (Aluminum), CGE (metallurgical), Petrobras (petroleum refining, cooking gas and nitrogen), LED, Liquigas (cooking gas), Chevron-Oronite (petroleum products), Oxiteno-Ultrapar (gas oil products, except CNG), Firestone (tires), Saint-Gobain (automotive glass), Magneti Marelli-Cofap (metallurgy and automotive parts).

== Transport ==
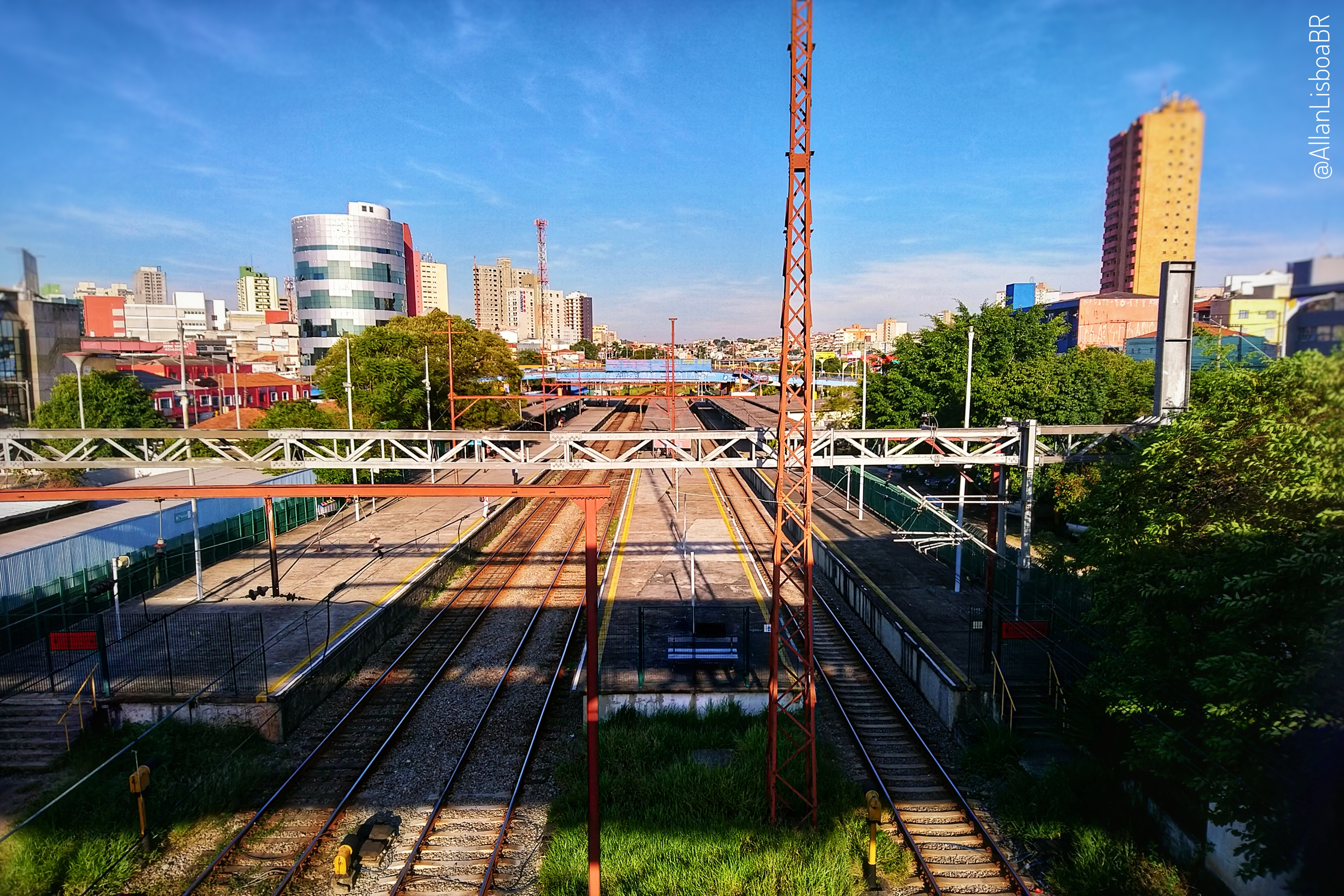
Mauá Station Platform Overview

The city is served by CPTM Line 10, passing through the Capuava, Mauá and Guapituba stations. It is also served by the METRA bus rapid transit system, having one stop and a trolleybus line which goes to the Sônia Maria terminal.

Currently, the city bus system is operated by the company Suzantur.

== Geography ==
=== Climate ===
The city is located 818 metres (2,684 ft) above sea level, at the boundary between the Serra do Mar and the plateau. As a result, the city's climate is considered subtropical, with average temperature during the year at around 18 °C (64 °F), rarely exceeding 30 °C (86 °F) in summer. In winter the average is 14 °C (57 °F).

=== Topography ===
The landscape of Mauá is dominated by the formation of steep hills and peaks, as it is the usual Serra do Mar landscape, and by deep valleys and wetlands, today mostly grounded and occupied in a disordered way, which explains the high incidence of flooding there. Only the valley of Tamanduateí River on Capuava district is typically flat. Historical accounts describe the place as where the first bandeirantes, coming from São Vicente, saw the Planalto Paulista (São Paulo plateau) region and gave the name of Borda do Campo (that means Boundary of the Countryside) to the region, for making the transition between the Serra do Mar and the Planalto Paulista. The highest point in town is the Morro Pelado (Naked Hill), with 867 meters (the third highest of the Greater São Paulo), but the city is, on average, the highest of metropolitan region, due to the lack of flat areas.

=== Hydrography ===
The city has a special characteristic hydrographic: not be crossed by any water course from another city, since, due to the high altitude, all streams that cross the territory of Mauá has their sources inside the city limits.

Located in the city is the source of Tamanduateí River, the third largest affluent of the Tietê River in Greater São Paulo, the Oratório river and the Pinheirinho and Guaió rivers. The most important waterways in the urban area are the Taboão Stream, the Corumbé Stream and the Capitão João Stream (which flows under the XXII de Novembro square, in the downtown). Due to the disordered occupation of the floodplains, many places that before acted as absorbers of excessive rain water were grounded and the city has several points at high risk of flooding. The situation was eased with the construction of four reservoirs between the years 1998 and 2002. However, due to lack of maintenance, excessive garbage and siltation, the reservoirs cannot effectively avoid the flooding risk. Besides the disordered occupation, lack of sewerage and waste treatment makes the urban waterways completely polluted.

=== Vegetation ===
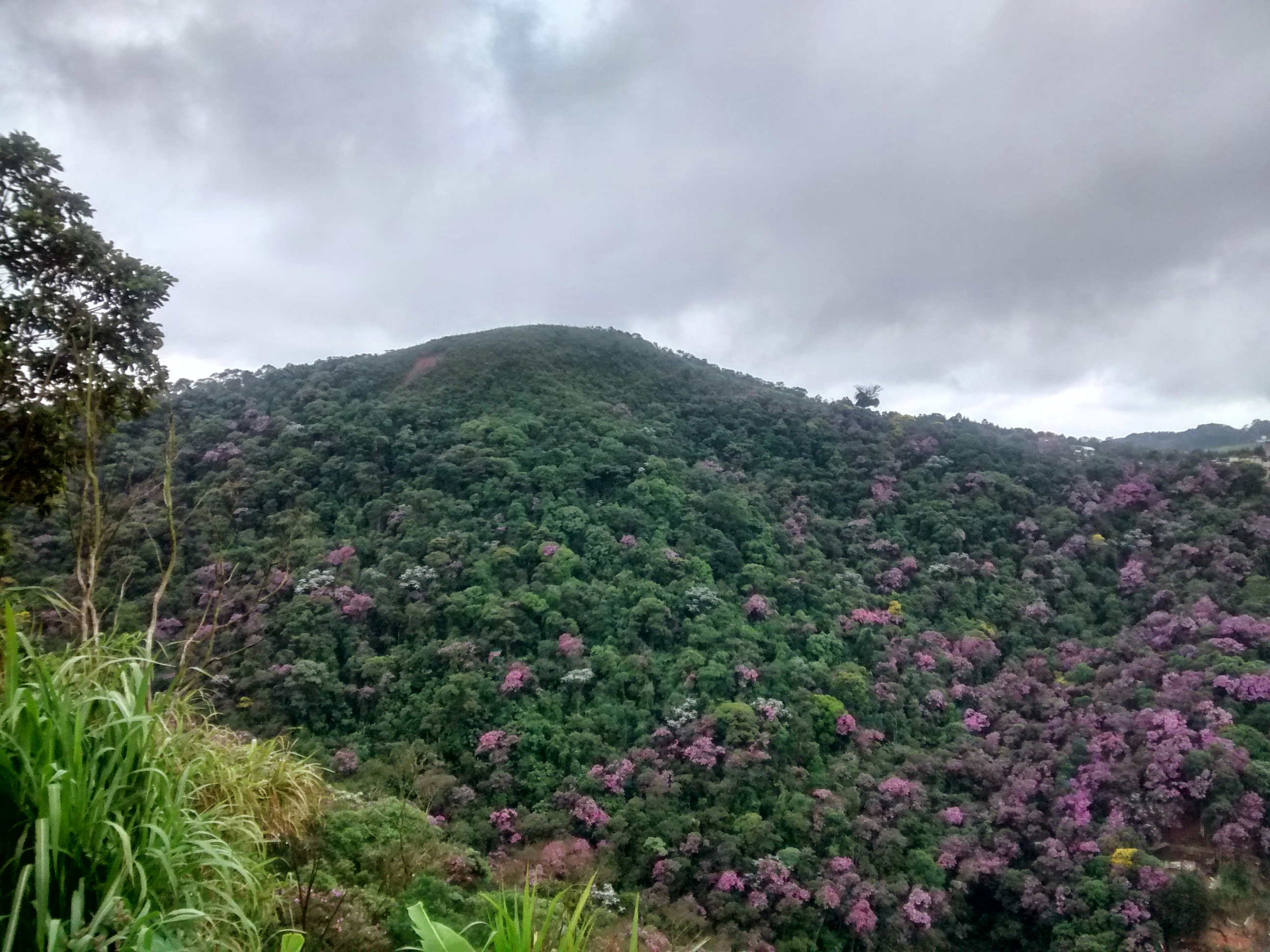
Vegetation typical of the Atlantic forest in Jardim Zaíra

Due to great variation in altitude, the city has a broad spectrum of natural landscapes, although much has been transformed by human occupation. The hillsides were originally occupied by a lush Atlantic Forest, though already mixed with species of Araucaria and Planalto Paulista typical of altitude climate. In the city, the Atlantic Forest areas most preserved are the wellsprings, the tank of Paulista, the Ecological Park Santa Luzia and the slopes of Guaraciaba. The wetlands were largely covered by reeds and cattails, plants typical of wetlands and marshlands. Currently, only the Taboão stream have the original vegetation in the urban environment, but will lose much of it due to rectification works to link up with the new Beltway. The valleys of the rivers Guaió and Pinheirinho and the region of Cappburgo are still with this vegetation, despite growing local slum. The peaks of the hills, especially the higher ones were covered by grasses and thin vegetation, currently the chief representative is the Morro Pelado, which takes its name from the very low vegetation cover.

== Demography ==
A large part of the population is descended from migrants from the Northeast, but also from Italian, German, Ukrainian, Spanish and Japanese immigrants.

== Media ==
In telecommunications, the city was served by Companhia Telefônica da Borda do Campo. In July 1998, this company was acquired by Telefónica, which adopted the Vivo brand in 2012. The company is currently an operator of cell phones, fixed lines, internet (fiber optics/4G) and television (satellite and cable).

== See also ==
- List of municipalities in São Paulo
