= Rodovia dos Imigrantes =

Highway in São Paulo

SP-160

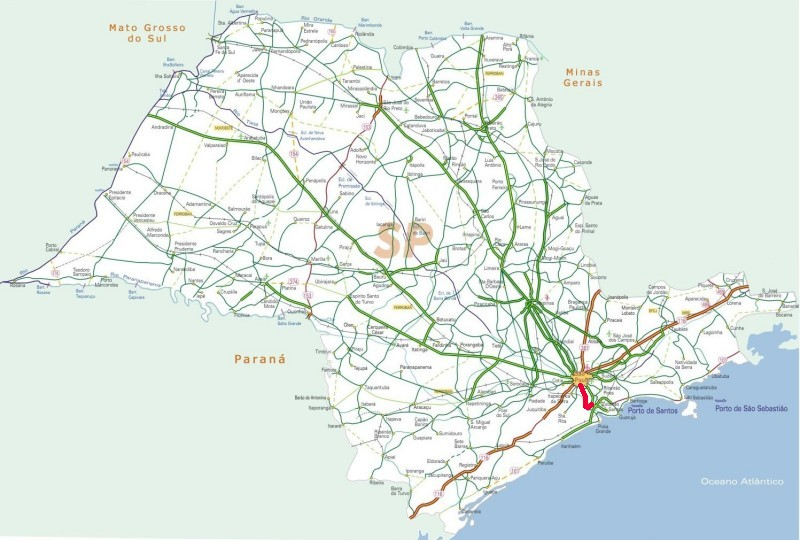
- Map of the itinerary of Imigrantes Highway (in red)

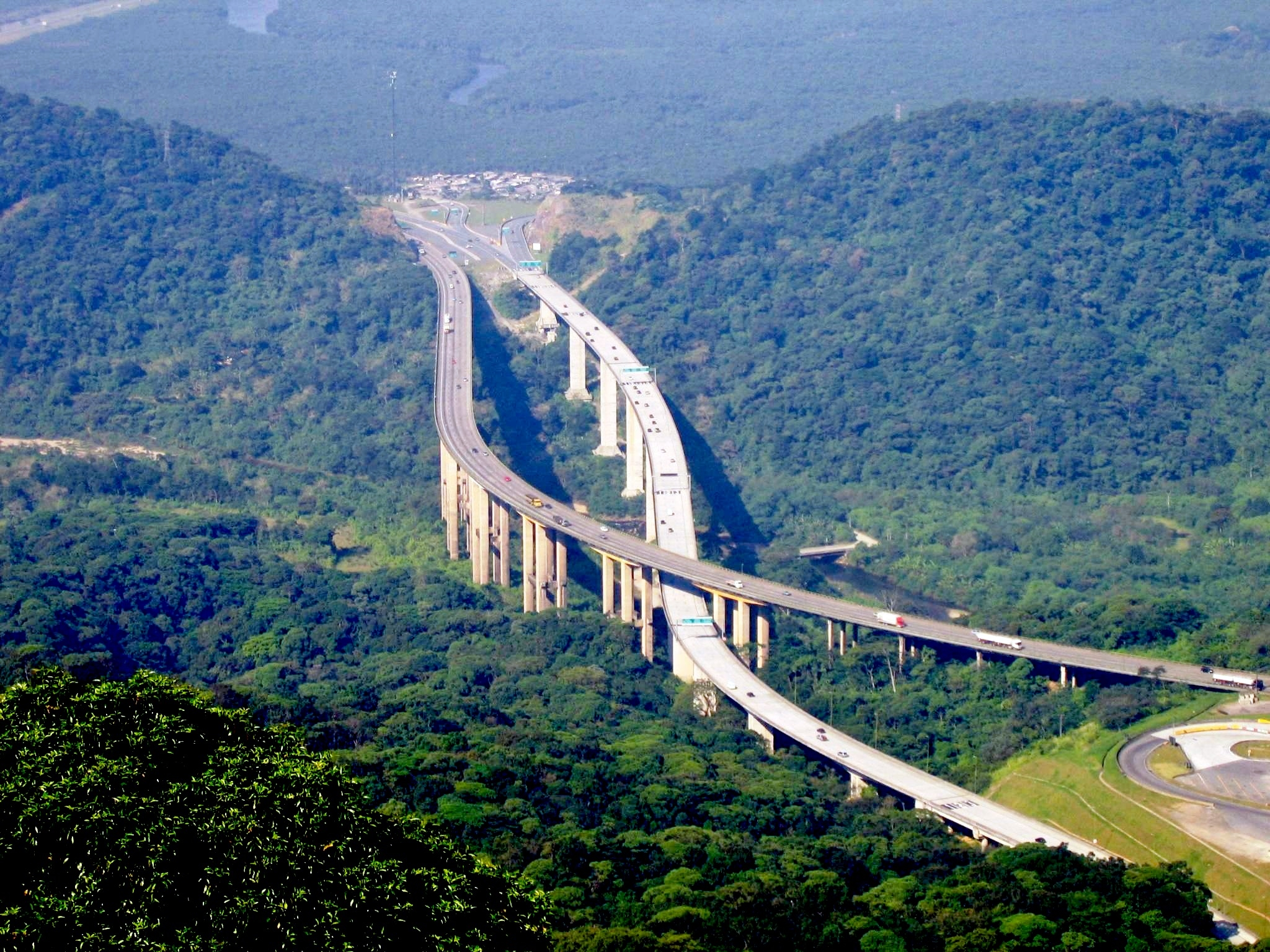
- A view of the north and south carriageways of Rodovia dos Imigrantes, one crossing over the other

Route information
- Length: 72 km (45 mi)
- Existed: 28 June 1976; 49 years ago (north lane); 17 December 2002; 22 years ago (south lane)–present

Major junctions
- North end: Av. Prof. Abraão de Morais in São Paulo
- South end: Avenida Ayrton Senna in Praia Grande

Location
- Country: Brazil
- State: São Paulo

Highway system
- Highways in Brazil; Federal; São Paulo State Highways

The Rodovia dos Imigrantes (official designation SP-160) is a highway in the state of São Paulo, Brazil. The highway connects the city of São Paulo to the Atlantic coast and with the seaside cities of São Vicente and Praia Grande. It follows the route of the Rodovia Anchieta and is also one of Brazil's busiest highways, especially on weekends.

The Rodovia dos Imigrantes has 44 viaducts, seven bridges, and 11 tunnels, along its 58.5 km stretch. The highway has recently been expanded, in one of the most audacious feats of Brazilian highway engineering, with extremely long tunnels and high strutting six-lane bridges constructed over the tropical rain forest, which covers the steep faces of the Serra do Mar, the cliff range that separates the São Paulo plateau from the seaside lowlands. During sunny weekends, more than one million automobiles commonly cross its near 60 km run, separating the city of São Paulo from the sea.

The Rodovia dos Imigrantes was inaugurated on Monday, 28 June 1976, by President Ernesto Geisel, due to traffic saturation on the Rodovia Anchieta. Although longer than the Anchieta, the Imigrantes is nowadays busier due to its building standards, which permit higher speed limits, and its more direct path to the cities of Santos and Guarujá, the northern coast (with Bertioga), as well as the southern coast (with cities Praia Grande, Mongaguá, and Itanhaém). Its south lane was inaugurated on Tuesday, 17 December 2002.

Meaning "immigrants' highway" in Portuguese, the Rodovia dos Imigrantes was so named as a way to remember the contribution of immigrants to the cultural, economic, and social development of Brazil.

It is managed by a state concession to the private company, Ecovias, which also maintains the Rodovia Anchieta; it is, therefore, a toll road.

The two carriageways of the Rodovia dos Imigrantes are both fully reversible and traffic is managed to flow either bidirectionally (uphill on one carriageway and downhill on the other) or unidirectionally (uphill or downhill on both carriageways), depending on demand. In the unidirectional mode, the opposing traffic is diverted to the Rodovia Anchieta.

== Directions ==
The path of the Immigrant Road crosses the following municipalities, all in the state of São Paulo: São Paulo, Diadema, São Bernardo do Campo, Cubatão, São Vicente and Praia Grande.

== Tolls ==
The Rodovia dos Imigrantes has been tolled since its inauguration. As in all the highways that suffered concessions, the tolls of the Imigrantes suffered strong readjustments, even after discounting inflation, considered excessive by significant users. Currently, the toll of the Imigrantes is the most expensive in the state, at R$ 35.30, valid for a round trip by car. In the stretch of plateau, the Imigrantes presents three tolls of blockade to the access to the bordering localities.

== See also ==
- Brazilian Highway System
- Highway system of São Paulo
- Rodovia Anchieta
