= São Paulo macrometropolis =

Human settlement in Brazil

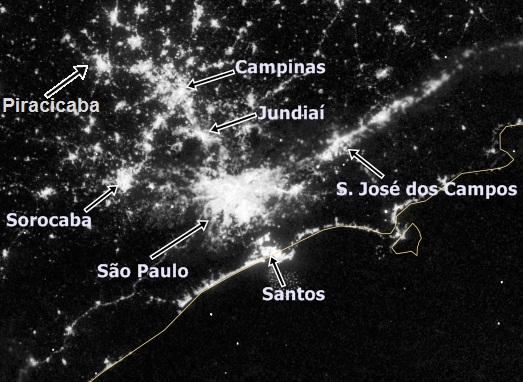
Satellite imagery of the Expanded Metropolitan Complex at night.

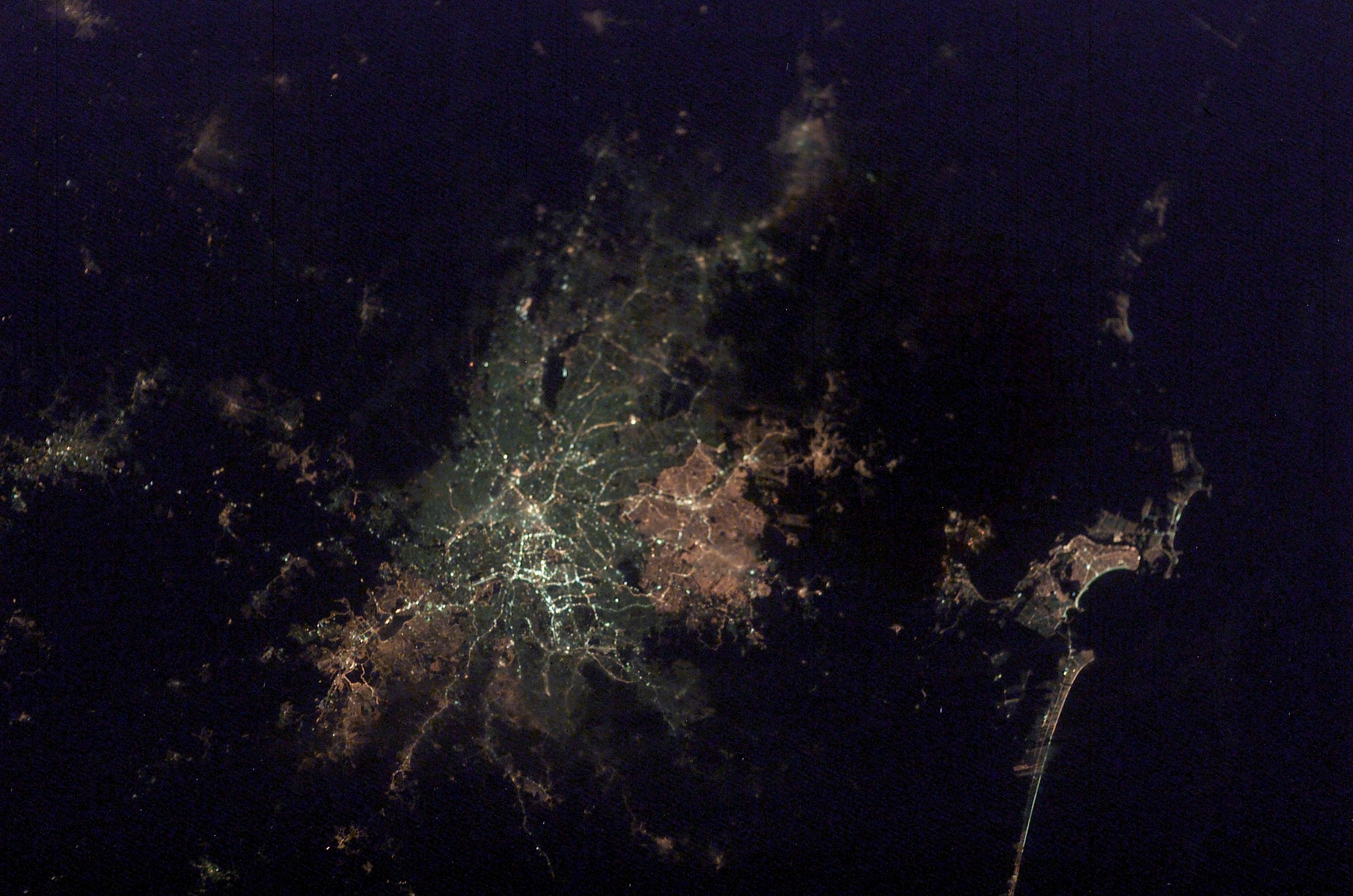
Greater São Paulo and Expanded Metropolitan Complex at night.

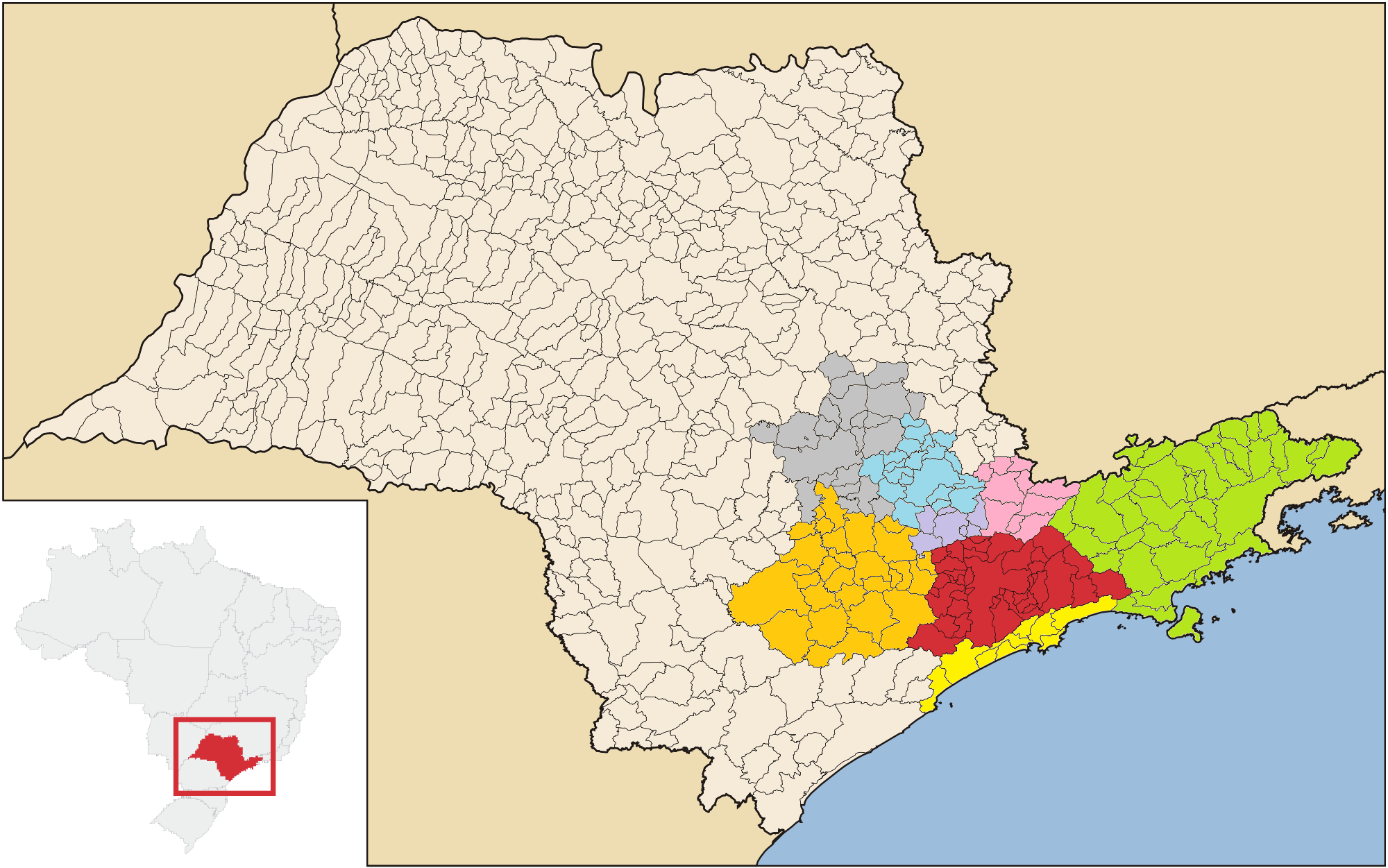
The macrometropolis and its divisions. Metropolitan Region of São Paulo, the core of the macrometropolis Metropolitan Region of Baixada Santista Metropolitan Region of Campinas Metropolitan Region of Vale do Paraíba e Litoral Norte Metropolitan Region of Sorocaba Metropolitan Region of Jundiaí Metropolitan Region of Piracicaba Regional Unit of Bragança Paulista city

The São Paulo Macrometropolis (Portuguese: Macrometrópole de São Paulo) or São Paulo Megalopolis (Portuguese: Megalópole de São Paulo), also known as Expanded Metropolitan Complex (Portuguese: Complexo Metropolitano Expandido), is a Brazilian megalopolis that emerged through the existing process of conurbation between the metropolitan areas located around the Greater São Paulo, with more than 30 million inhabitants, or 74 percent of São Paulo State's population, and is one of the most populous urban agglomerations in the world.

Beyond the Greater São Paulo, the megalopolis encompasses the metropolitan areas of Campinas, Baixada Santista, Sorocaba, Vale do Paraíba e Litoral Norte, Jundiaí and Piracicaba. The total population of these areas added to the state capital exceeds 31.5 million inhabitants, or about 75% of the population of the entire state of São Paulo.

The metropolitan complex is the only urban cluster (of agglomerations) of its kind in South America and covers an area of approximately 53 thousand square kilometers, connecting 174 municipalities and retains much of the industrial and economic output of the country.

The urban sprawl resulted from decades of conurbation, economic shifts, and a change in population preferences, with people increasingly favoring the interior over the saturated capital.

Although the first signs of conurbation appeared in Porto Ferreira (along the Anhanguera highway) and São Carlos (along the Washington Luís highway), the Macrometropolis officially begins in Pirassununga and extends through Leme, Araras, Rio Claro and Limeira; beyond the last of these cities, there are no longer any green spaces separating the urban areas.

== Divisions ==
	Region	Population	Seat city	Population
1	Metropolitan Region of São Paulo	21,860,000	São Paulo	12,310,000
2	Metropolitan Region of Campinas	3,300,000	Campinas	1,215,000
3	Metropolitan Region of Vale do Paraíba e Litoral Norte	2,550,000	São José dos Campos	725,000
4	Metropolitan Region of Sorocaba	2,150,000	Sorocaba	685,000
5	Metropolitan Region of Baixada Santista	1,880,000	Santos	435,000
6	Metropolitan Region of Piracicaba	1,500,000	Piracicaba	410,000
7	Metropolitan Region of Jundiaí	825,000	Jundiaí	425,000
8	Regional Unit of Bragança Paulista city	480,000	Bragança Paulista	170,000
São Paulo Macrometropolis			34,500,000	

== Biggest Municipalities ==
=== 1,000,000+ ===
- São Paulo (São Paulo) (12,038,175)
- Guarulhos (São Paulo) (1,337,087)
- Campinas (Campinas) (1,173,370)

=== 500,000–999,999 ===
- São Bernardo do Campo (São Paulo) (822,242)
- São José dos Campos (Vale do Paraíba) (795,992)
- Santo André (São Paulo) (712,749)
- Osasco (São Paulo) (696,382)
- Sorocaba (Sorocaba) (652,481)

=== 200,000–499,999 ===
- Mauá (São Paulo) (457,696)
- Santos (Baixada Santista) (434,359)
- Mogi das Cruzes (São Paulo) (429,321)
- Diadema (São Paulo) (415,180)
- Jundiaí (Jundiaí) (405,740)
- Carapicuíba (São Paulo) (394,465)
- Piracicaba (Piracicaba) (394,419)
- São Vicente (Baixada Santista) (357,989)
- Itaquaquecetuba (São Paulo) (356,774)
- Guarujá (Baixada Santista) (313,421)
- Taubaté (Vale do Paraíba) (305,174)
- Limeira (Piracicaba) (298,701)
- Praia Grande (Baixada Santista) (304,705)
- Suzano (São Paulo) (288,056)
- Taboão da Serra (São Paulo) (275,948)
- Sumaré (Campinas) (269,522)
- Barueri (São Paulo) (264,935)
- Embu das Artes (São Paulo) (264,448)
- Indaiatuba (Campinas) (235,367)
- Cotia (São Paulo) (233,696)
- Americana (Campinas) (231,621)
- Jacareí (Vale do Paraíba) (228,214)
- Itapevi (São Paulo) (226,488)
- Hortolândia (Campinas) (219,039)
- Rio Claro (Piracicaba) (201,473)

=== 100,000–199,999 ===
- Santa Bárbara d'Oeste (Campinas) (191,074)
- Ferraz de Vasconcelos (São Paulo)(176,000)
- Itu (Sorocaba) (170,157)
- Bragança Paulista (Jundiaí) (164,000)
- Itapetininga (Sorocaba) (160,000)
- Itapecerica da Serra (São Paulo) (159,000)
- Pindamonhangaba (Vale do Paraíba) (154,082)
- Francisco Morato (Jundiaí) (155,000)
- São Caetano do Sul (São Paulo) (151,000)
- Mogi Guaçu (Campinas) (149,296)
- Atibaia (Jundiaí) (139,683)
- Franco da Rocha (Jundiaí) (129,000)
- Cubatão (Baixada Santista) (127,000)
- Valinhos (Campinas) (122,000)
- Araras (Piracicaba) (121,282)
- Votorantim (Sorocaba) (119,000)
- Tatuí (Sorocaba) (118,000)
- Várzea Paulista (Jundiaí) (116,000)
- Salto (Sorocaba) (116,000)
- Guaratinguetá (Vale do Paraíba) (114,000)
- Itatiba (Jundiaí) (114,000)
- Poá (São Paulo) (112,481)
- Ribeirão Pires (São Paulo) (112,020)
- Santana de Parnaíba (São Paulo) (111,000)
- Jandira (São Paulo) (110,000)
- Caraguatatuba (Vale do Paraíba) (107,000)
- Itanhaém (Baixada Santista) (100,496)
- Paulínia (Campinas) (100,000)

== See also ==
- Rio de Janeiro–São Paulo megalopolis
- Megacity
