= SP-55 (São Paulo highway) =

Highway in São Paulo

SP-055

Route information
- Length: 336.200 km (208.905 mi)

Location
- Country: Brazil
- State: São Paulo

Highway system
- Highways in Brazil; Federal; São Paulo State Highways

SP-055 is a state highway located in the eastern and southeastern parts of the state of São Paulo, Brazil. The highway runs from the city of Ubatuba to Pedro de Toledo, connecting with the BR-116 highway.

The highway has a total length of approximately 354 kilometers and is divided into four sections:

- Rodovia Doutor Manuel Hipólito Rego: from Ubatuba to Bertioga. This section is part of the Rodovia Rio-Santos (BR-101) and is administered by the São Paulo state road department (DER-SP).
- Unnamed section: from Bertioga to the junction with SP-248/055 near Monte Cabrão.
- Rodovia Cônego Domenico Rangoni: from SP-248/055 (Monte Cabrão) to Cubatão.
- Rodovia Padre Manuel da Nóbrega: from Cubatão through Itanhaém and Peruíbe to Pedro de Toledo, where it connects with the BR-116.

The highway also provides access to the municipality of Guarujá, linking the mainland to Santo Amaro Island.

Some parts of SP-055 form part of the Sistema Anchieta-Imigrantes highway system and are managed by the private concessionaire Ecovias.

== Doutor Manuel Hipólito Rego Highway ==
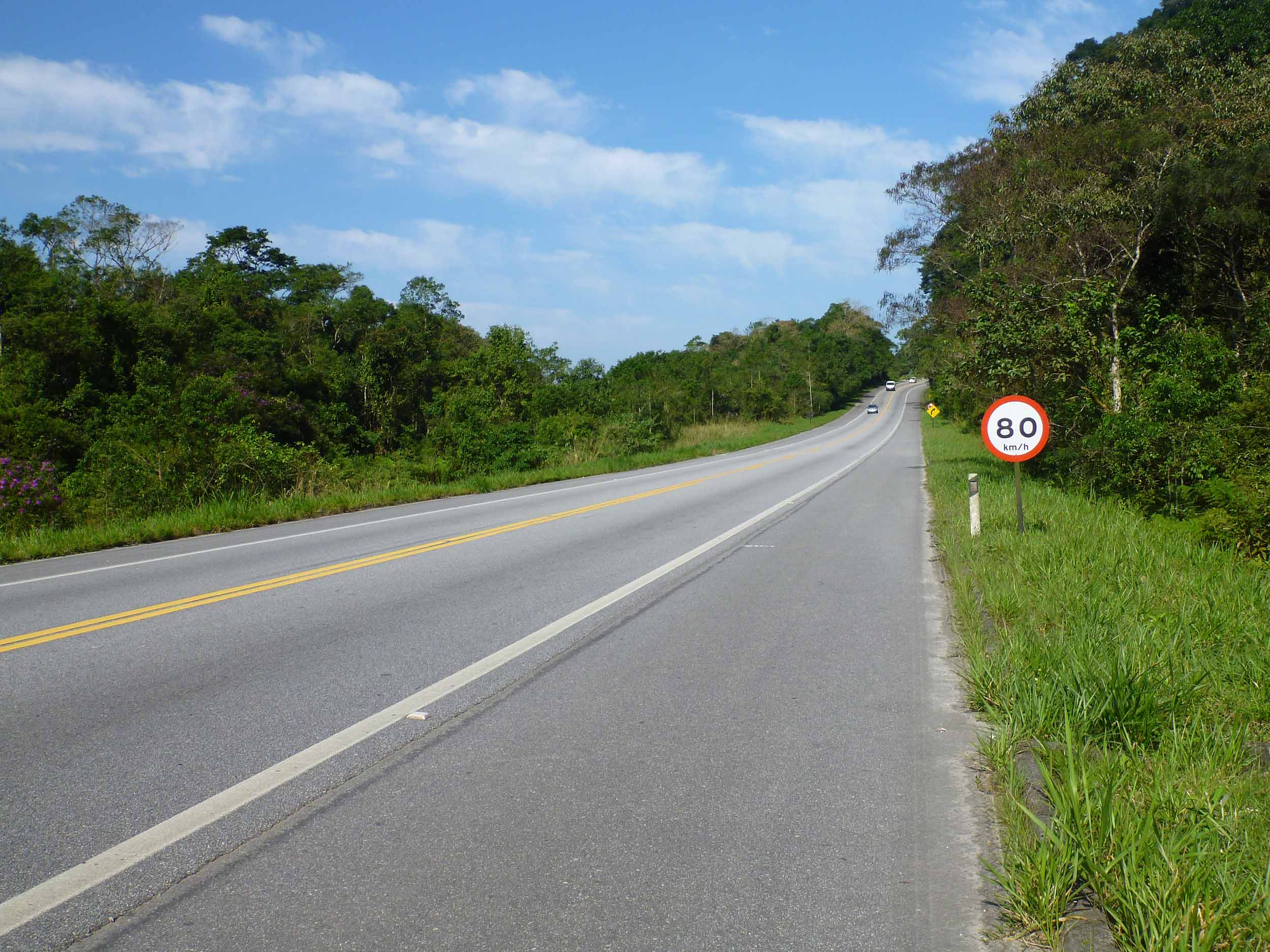
The "Doutor Manuel Hipólito Rego" highway near Bertioga.

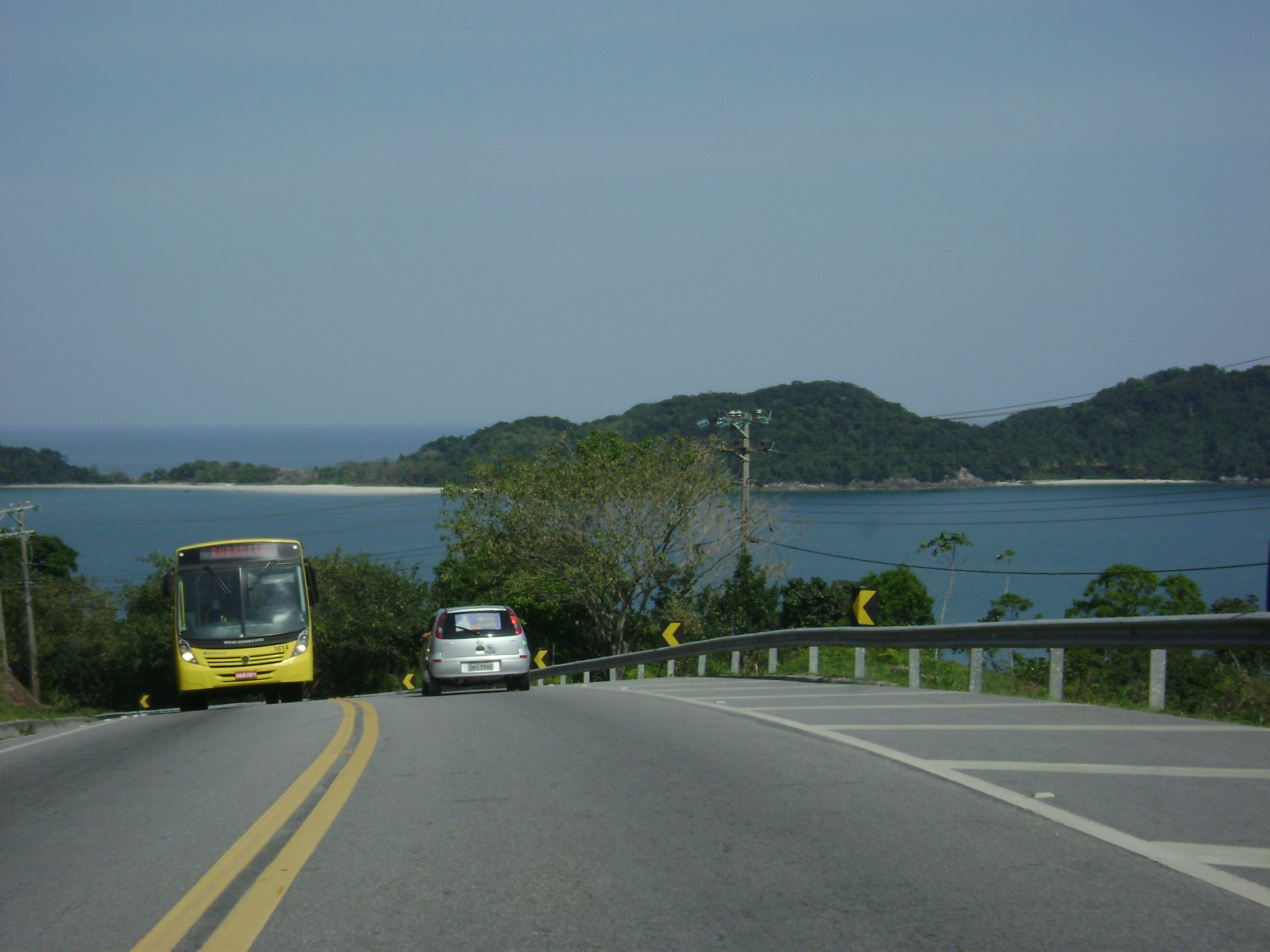
Highway SP-055 passing through the municipality of São Sebastião.

The first section of highway SP-055 is named Doutor Manuel Hipólito Rego and begins in Praia Grande, within the municipality of Ubatuba. It passes through the coastal cities of Caraguatatuba, Ilhabela, São Sebastião, Bertioga, and ends at the junction with the Cônego Domenico Rangoni highway near Guarujá. From this last junction, there is also access to Santo Amaro Island.

It is part of the Rio-Santos Highway (BR-101) and is managed by the São Paulo State Department of Roads (DER-SP). Its layout consists of stretches with long straight sections as well as winding parts with numerous curves and narrow lanes. It is a dual carriageway from the Enseada neighborhood in São Sebastião to the junction with the Rodovia dos Tamoios (SP-099) in Caraguatatuba.

In 1985, with the completion of paving works, the coastal municipalities of the northern São Paulo coast experienced significant economic growth that continues to this day, due to an increase in tourists attracted by the natural beauty of the region and the ease of access. This factor also caused a population increase in these municipalities. During the summer and long holiday periods, traffic is intense along the entire route, especially near the intersections with the Mogi-Bertioga and Tamoios highways and in the urban sections of São Sebastião, Caraguatatuba, and Ubatuba.

Much of the traffic consists of tourists using the highway to reach coastal cities and the expanding residential condominiums along its course.

== Cônego Domenico Rangoni Highway ==
The Cônego Domenico Rangoni section, also known as Piaçaguera-Guarujá, extends from the roundabout in the Monte Cabrão neighborhood (Santos) to the Rodovia Anchieta highway, covering a total length of 33 kilometers. It was constructed in the 1970s to alleviate traffic caused by the old and worn ferry crossings between Santos and Guarujá. This section shares its designation with the federal highway BR-101 and is maintained by the São Paulo State Government through the Department of Roads (DER), under concession to the company Ecovias.

The highway features a tunnel called "Túnel dos Quilombos" and runs along the petrochemical complex of Cubatão. It has three lanes in each direction, with one lane primarily reserved for trucks.

=== Access to Guarujá ===
This access road is 8 kilometers long, entirely within Santo Amaro Island. It begins at the roundabout in the Monte Cabrão neighborhood in Santos, where it connects with the Rodovia Doutor Manuel Hipólito Rego, and links the mainland to the municipality of Guarujá, located on the island. It is maintained and operated by the private concessionaire Ecovias and forms part of the Sistema Anchieta-Imigrantes highway system.

The road includes three roundabouts:

- km 2: Vicente de Carvalho district
- km 5: Sítio Conceiçãozinha neighborhood (left bank of the Port of Santos)
- km 6: Access to Avenida Lydio Martins Corrêa, which connects to Praia da Enseada and other beaches in the eastern region of the island, including Iporanga, Éden, Sorocotuba, Pernambuco, Perequê, São Pedro, Pinheiro, Camburi, Preta, and Branca.

== Padre Manuel da Nóbrega Highway ==
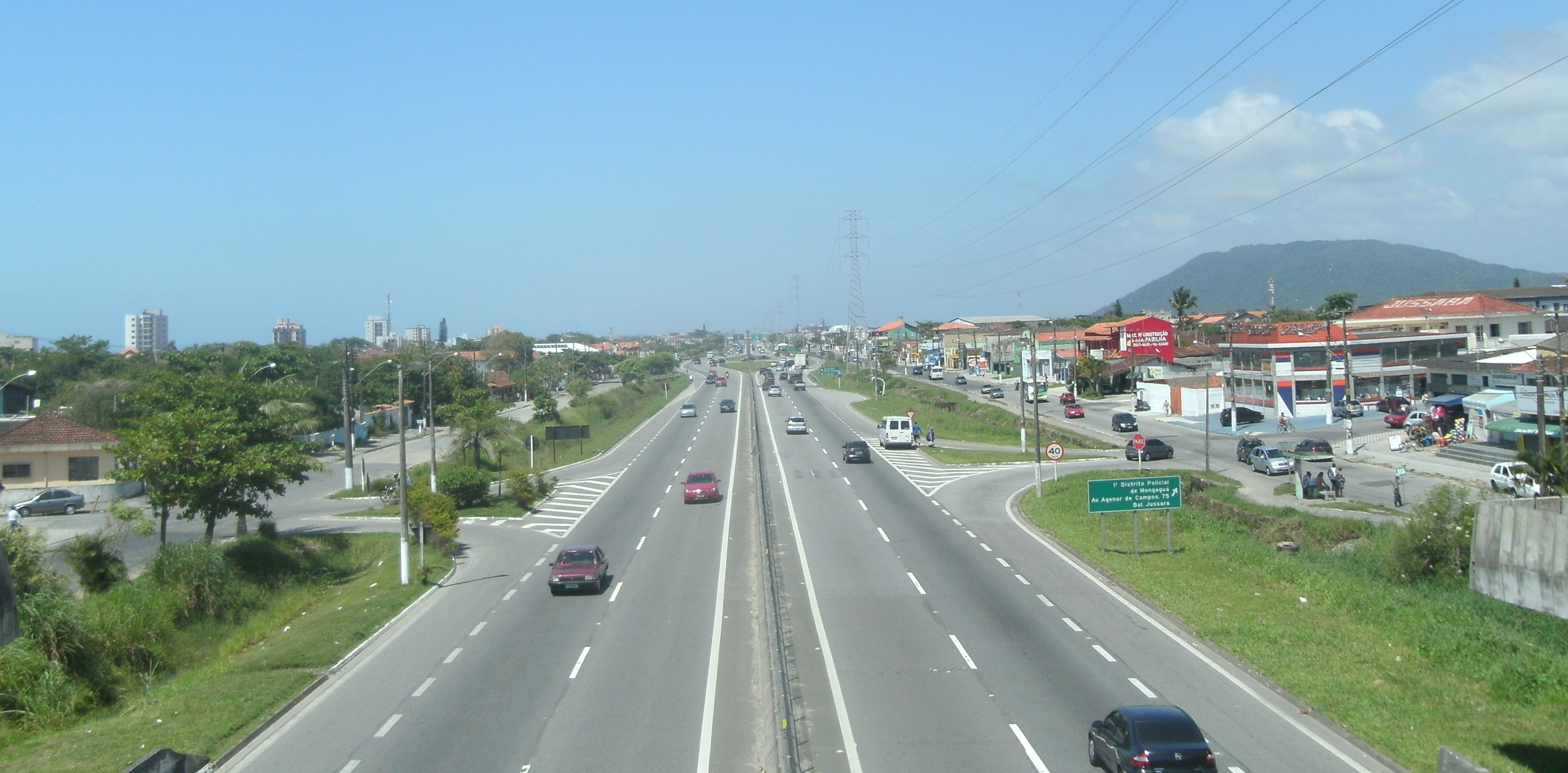
The "Padre Manuel da Nóbrega" highway is a dual carriageway between the municipalities of Cubatão and Peruíbe.

The final section, named Padre Manuel da Nóbrega, extends for 118 kilometers from the Rodovia Anchieta to the Régis Bittencourt highway (BR-116), near Miracatu.

It connects the municipalities of Cubatão, São Vicente, Praia Grande, Mongaguá, Itanhaém, and Peruíbe, located along the São Paulo coast, with Itariri, Pedro de Toledo, and Miracatu, situated in the Vale do Ribeira region.

This section is a dual carriageway between Cubatão and the municipality of Peruíbe. It shares its designation with the federal highway BR-101 and is maintained by the São Paulo State Department of Roads (DER-SP).

== See also ==
- List of highways in Brazil
