= Rodovia Rio-Santos =

Highway in Brazil

BR-101 Transcoastal Highway
- Translitorânea
- Rodovia Rio-Santos
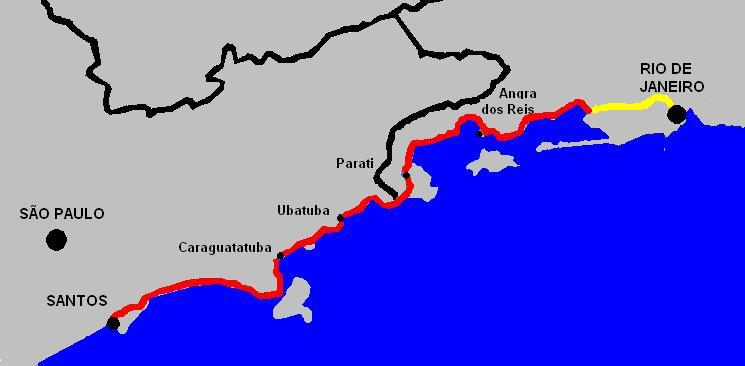
- Map of Rio-Santos in red

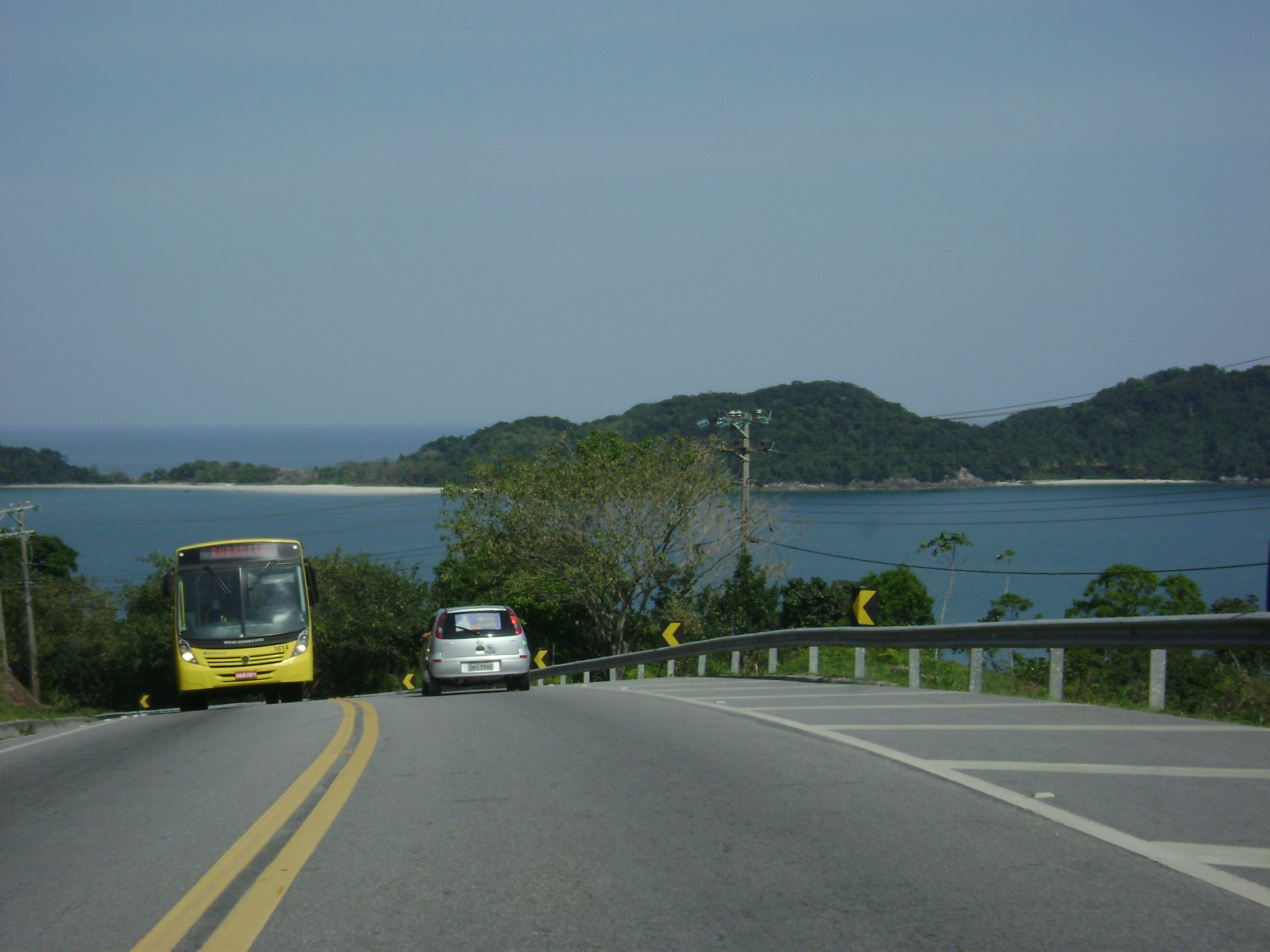
- Rodovia Rio-Santos in Juqueí Beach

Route information
- Maintained by CCR Rio-SP (since 2022)
- Length: 550 km (340 mi)
- Existed: 1985–present

Major junctions
- North end: Avenida Brasil in Rio de Janeiro, RJ
- RJ-165; RJ-155; RJ-149; RJ-014; RJ-099; SP-98, SP-99; SP-125
- South end: SP-55 in Bertioga, SP

Location
- Country: Brazil
- States: Rio de Janeiro, São Paulo

Highway system
- BR-101

The Rodovia Rio—Santos is a Brazilian federal highway in the states of Rio de Janeiro and São Paulo that connects the municipalities of Rio de Janeiro to Santos (Continental Area) on the paulista coast. It is part of the BR-101 highway.

== History ==
The DNIT manages the stretch between Santa Cruz, in Rio de Janeiro to Praia Grande, in Ubatuba. The stretch between Ubatuba and the junction with Rodovia Cônego Domênio Rangoni is part of the road network of the state of São Paulo, receiving the name Rodovia Doutor Manuel Hipólito Rego (SP-55), this section is under the administration of the Departamento de Estradas de Rodagem.

The highway is famous for bordering the São Paulo and Rio de Janeiro coastlines, running just a few kilometers from the sea and parallel to it. Famous tourist resorts are located around the highway, such as Itaguaí, Mangaratiba, Angra dos Reis, Paraty, Ubatuba, Caraguatatuba, São Sebastião, Ilhabela, Bertioga, where most of the time it passes between the beaches of these resorts.

Despite the name of the highway, it does not provide access to the urban area of the municipality of Santos which is on the island. For such access it is necessary to use the Rodovia Anchieta or the Travessia Santos—Guarujá ferries.

== Duplication ==
In 2009, the duplication of 26 kilometers between Santa Cruz and Itacuruçá was opened to the public, a stretch located in the state of Rio de Janeiro, close to the state capital.

The road offers good conditions for shouldering and offers walkways on the stretch towards Rio de Janeiro to the municipality of Mangaratiba, near the Itacuruçá neighborhood.

Most of the São Paulo section (SP-55) with 172 km between Ubatuba and Bertioga could be duplicated by 2017. and the highway is among those that are part of the government's concession plan

== See also ==
- Novo Milénio: Rodovia Rio-Santos
- estradas.com.br: História Rio-Santos
- Um giro pela Rio-Santos e os planos de duplicação do trecho paulista
