= Rio de Janeiro–São Paulo megalopolis =

Megalopolis in Brazil

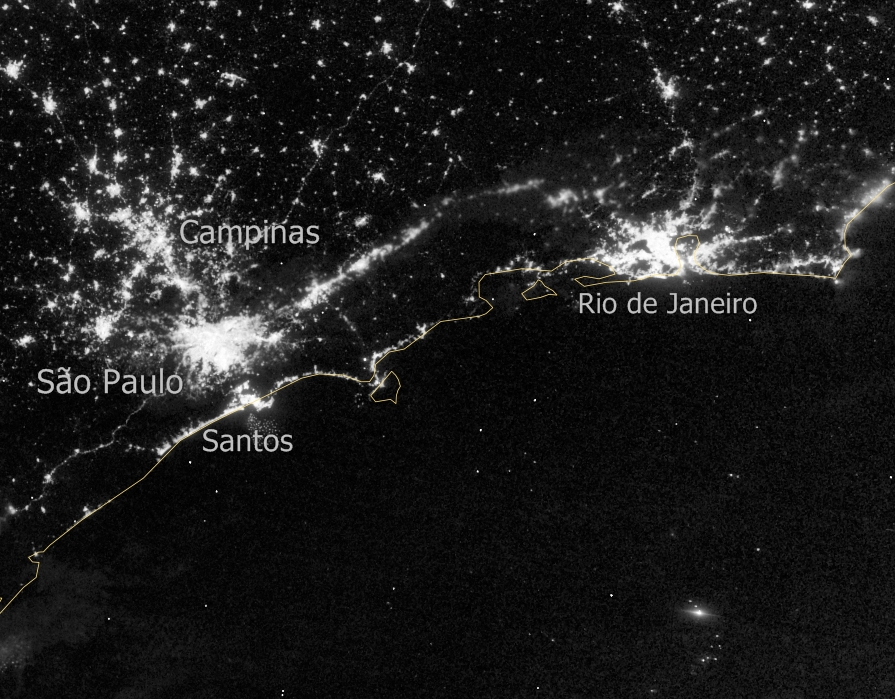
Image from satellite of the megalopolis at night.

The Rio de Janeiro–São Paulo Megalopolis, also known as the Brazilian Megalopolis and the Southeast Brazilian Megalopolis, is a megalopolis in Southern Brazil consisting of the cities of Rio de Janeiro and São Paulo, as well as their surrounding urban areas.

Their process of conurbation is occurring between the Expanded Metropolitan Complex, in the state of São Paulo, and the Rio de Janeiro metropolitan area. This megalopolis in formation involves several Brazilian metropolitan centers (Rio de Janeiro, São Paulo, Campinas, Piracicaba, Jundiaí, Vale do Paraíba, Sorocaba and Baixada Santista) located in the Southeast Region of Brazil. The metropolitan regions of Campinas and São Paulo, however, are in a more advanced process of integration and already form the first macrometropolis in the Southern Hemisphere—the Expanded Metropolitan Complex—which exceeds 32 million inhabitants (approximately 75% of the population of the state of São Paulo or 18% of the Brazilian population).

This area of 82,616 square kilometres (0.97% of the Brazilian territory) is composed of 232 municipalities in three different states (Rio de Janeiro, São Paulo and Minas Gerais). The megalopolis includes the metropolitan regions of Rio de Janeiro and São Paulo and extends from Campos dos Goytacazes, in northern Rio de Janeiro state, to Campinas in the interior of São Paulo state, also passing through Juiz de Fora in the Zona da Mata of Minas Gerais. According to data from the IBGE, about 42 million people live in this region, representing 23% of Brazil's total population. Among the main urban centers that compose the megalopolis are, in addition to São Paulo and Rio de Janeiro, the cities of Guarulhos, Campinas, Jundiaí, Piracicaba, Santos, São José dos Campos, Sorocaba, Duque de Caxias, Volta Redonda, Petrópolis, São Gonçalo, Campos dos Goytacazes and Niterói.

In 1999, Brian J. Godfrey wrote: "Even as Rio de Janeiro and Sao Paulo have sprawled to form the two main nuclei of an integrated megalopolis with a current population of between 30 and 60 million in southeastern Brazil, the two cities retain distinguishing characteristics."

In 1993, Jean Gottmann, who studied the Northeast megalopolis in the 1960s, also suggested the formation of this megalopolis.

The entire Rio–São Paulo area is also sometimes considered a conurbation, and plans are in the works to connect the cities with a high-speed rail. Yet the government of Brazil does not consider this area a single unit for statistical purposes, and any population numbers would be synthetic. Another estimate published by Stanley D. Brunn, et al. suggests a population of 50 million.

As of December 2013, Rio de Janeiro to São Paulo is the third-busiest air traffic route by passenger volume, according to Amadeus.

== Definition ==
The existence of a Brazilian megalopolis remains the subject of debate in geographic literature. Some studies describe an urban agglomeration extending along an axis in the Southeast Region, particularly through the Paraíba Valley and North Coast Metropolitan Region, linking the metropolitan region of São Paulo and the metropolitan region of Rio de Janeiro, mainly via the Dutra Highway. Other interpretations expand this concept by including additional metropolitan areas such as the Baixada Santista and the Sorocaba Metropolitan Region.

Other works question the existence of such a megalopolis, or argue that although the metropolitan regions are becoming increasingly interconnected, full integration has not yet been achieved and the process remains ongoing.

The broader area described by some authors is home to about 22% of Brazil's population while covering only 0.5% of the national territory. It is also responsible for roughly 60% of Brazil's total industrial production.

Some researchers identify a more clearly consolidated megalopolitan structure between São Paulo and Campinas, often described as a macrometropolis according to the definition used by EMPLASA. This area is characterized by a continuous urbanized zone and strong economic and social integration. The urban corridor has expanded toward centers such as Sorocaba, the Piracicaba metropolitan region, and the Baixada Santista. In the opposite direction it extends toward São José dos Campos and the Paraíba Valley, and some analyses suggest that continued expansion could eventually link the metropolitan regions of São Paulo and Rio de Janeiro into a single urban corridor.

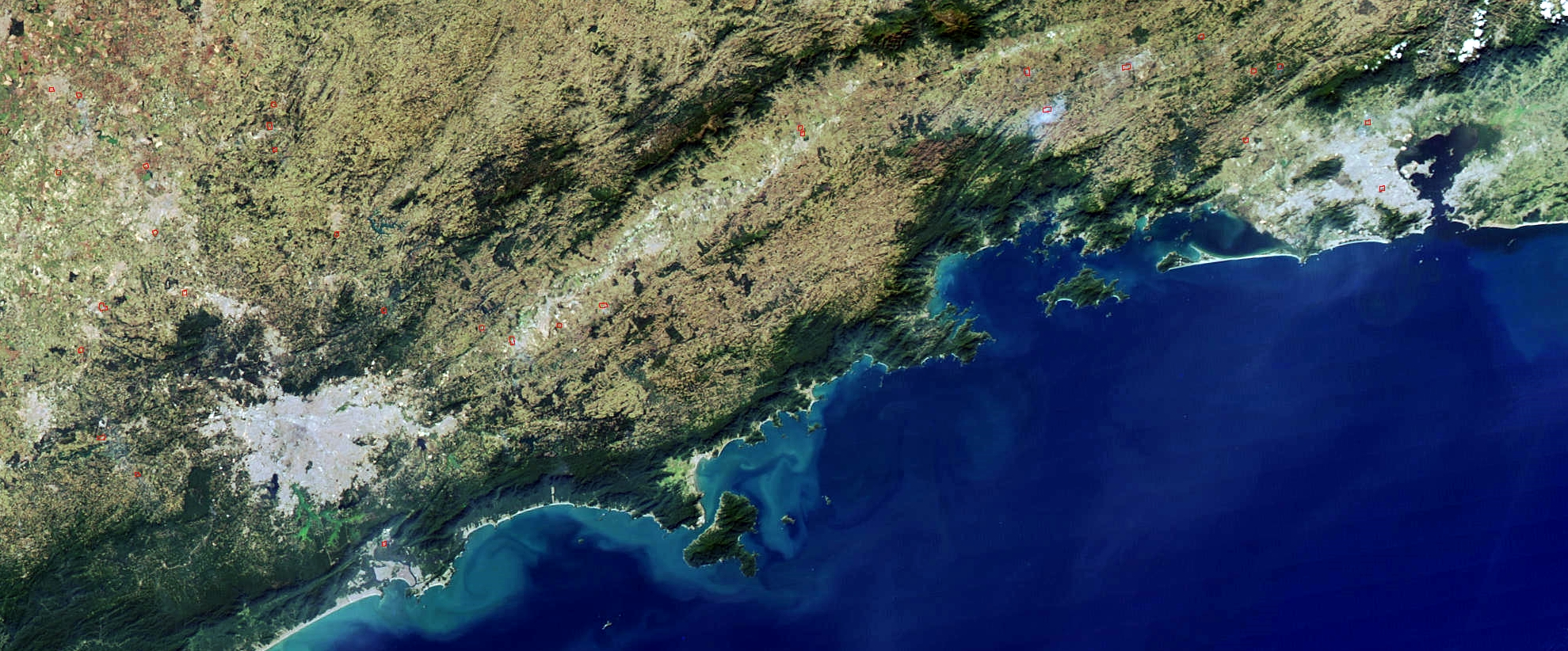
Rio–São Paulo megalopolis

== See also ==
- São Paulo macrometropolis
