= Prohibition of dying =

Law prohibiting death in specific places

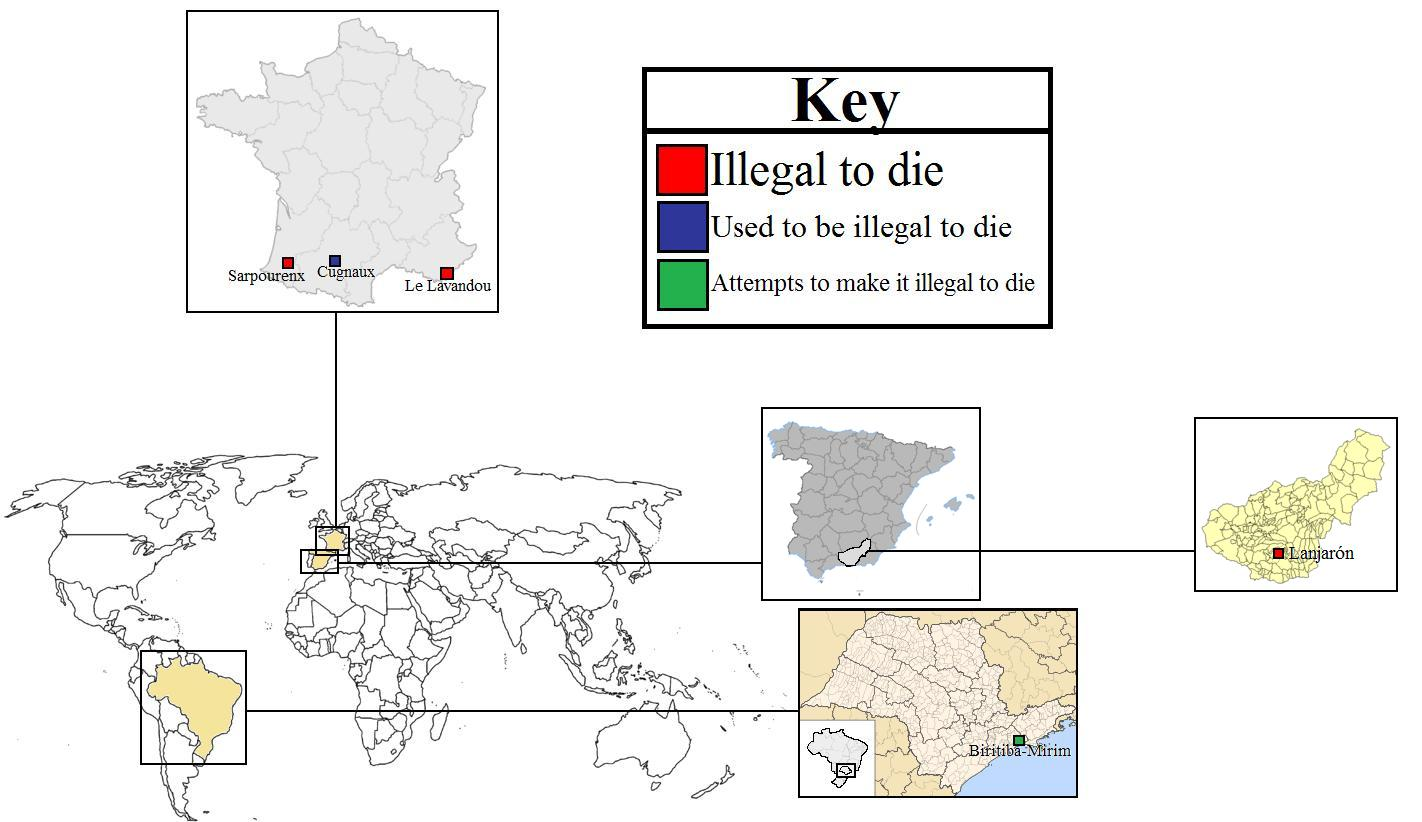
Map showing places where it is illegal to die, where it used to be illegal to die, and where there are attempts to make it illegal to die

Prohibition of dying is a political social phenomenon and taboo in which a law is passed stating that it is illegal to die, usually specifically in a certain political division or in a specific building.

The earliest case of prohibition of death occurred in the 5th century BC, on the Greek island of Delos; dying on Delos was prohibited on religious grounds.

Today, in most cases, the prohibition of death is a satirical response to the government's failure to approve the expansion of municipal cemeteries. In Spain, one town has prohibited death; in France, there have been several settlements which have had death prohibited; while in Biritiba Mirim, in Brazil, an attempt to prohibit death took place in 2005.

There is a falsely rumoured prohibition on recording deaths in royal palaces in the United Kingdom, for rather different reasons.

== Ancient ==
=== Greece ===
The island of Delos was considered a sacred and holy place by the ancient Greeks, and various measures were taken to "purify" the island and render it fit for the proper worship of the gods. In the 6th century BC, the tyrant Peisistratus, of the city-state of Athens, ordered that all graves within sight of the island's temple be dug up and the bodies removed to locations on or beyond the perimeter. In the 5th century BC, under instruction from the Delphic Oracle, the entire island was purged of all dead bodies, and it was forbidden for anybody else to die or give birth on the island.

== Modern ==
=== Brazil ===
The mayor of Biritiba-Mirim filed a public bill in 2005, to make it illegal for the people living in the town to die. Although no specific punishments have been presented, the mayor intends to target relatives of people who die with fines and even jail if necessary to get more space for tombstones.

The main reason for the attempt to pass such a law with such severe punishments if broken is that the town's 28,000 inhabitants apparently do not look after their health properly, making them more vulnerable to death, which would mean having to bury more corpses in the already full cemetery. Since the cemetery was inaugurated in 1910, over 50,000 people have been buried in 3,500 crypts and tombs. In November 2005, the cemetery was declared to be full and 20 recently deceased residents were forced to share a crypt, and several others were buried under the walkways.

The mayor, to support his uncommon proposal for a law, stated that 89% of the town is occupied by rivers, of which most are underground and serve as vital water sources for nearly two million people living in São Paulo, and that the remaining area is protected because it consists of tropical jungle. So, public land five times the size of the cemetery was set aside to provide space for a new one, which environmental experts claim will not affect water tables or surrounding tropical forest. The environment council decided to analyze such a solution carefully, while the state government had agreed to help build a new vertical cemetery; but, as of 2005, nothing has been done, and the law has not yet been passed, leaving the situation in suspense.

=== France ===
Three settlements in southern France have prohibited death. The mayor of Le Lavandou outlawed death in 2000, after planning permission for a new cemetery was turned down due to environmental concerns. He described the new bylaw as "an absurd law to counter an absurd situation". In 2007, Cugnaux also prohibited death, for similar reasons, and was subsequently granted permission to enlarge the local cemetery; inspired by the town's success, Sarpourenx was next to follow suit, in 2008.

=== Japan ===
The island of Itsukushima is considered a sacred location in Shinto belief, and is the site of the Itsukushima Shrine, a UNESCO World Heritage Site. Purity is of utmost concern in Shinto worship, and because of this, the shrine's priests have attempted to keep the island free of the pollution of death. Immediately after the Battle of Miyajima in 1555, the only battle to have taken place on the island, the victorious commander had the bodies of the fallen troops removed to the mainland, and ordered that the entire battlefield be cleansed of the blood that was spilled, to the point that buildings were scrubbed and blood-soaked soil was removed from the island. Retaining the purity of the Itsukushima Shrine is so important that since 1878, no deaths or births have been permitted near the shrine. To this day, pregnant women are supposed to retreat to the mainland as the day of delivery approaches, as are terminally ill or the very elderly whose passing has become imminent. Burials on the island are still forbidden.

=== Spain ===
Death has been prohibited in the Andalusian town of Lanjarón. The village, with 4,000 inhabitants, is to remain under this law until the government buys land for a new cemetery. The mayor who issued the edict explains that the awkward new law is his response to politicians urging him to find a quick fix for a long-lasting problem. The edict has become wildly popular amongst residents, even amongst political opponents of the mayor who issued the law, and was received with a sense of humor from most.

== Myths ==
=== United Kingdom ===
A story sometimes reported in the United Kingdom states it is forbidden for commoners to die in a royal palace, such as the Palace of Westminster, on the grounds that anyone who dies in a royal palace is technically entitled to a state funeral. However, this has been proven to be a myth, as at least four people (Guy Fawkes, Walter Raleigh, Spencer Perceval and Alfred Billson) have died in the grounds of the Palace of Westminster without receiving a state funeral; instead, until 2013, the Coroner of the Queen's Household had jurisdiction over inquests into deaths in royal palaces, and it was often procedurally simpler to use ordinary coroners by declaring the individual dead on arrival at the nearest hospital.
