= Restinga de Bertioga State Park =

State park in São Paulo, Brazil

- Parque Estadual Restinga de Bertioga
- IUCN category II (national park)
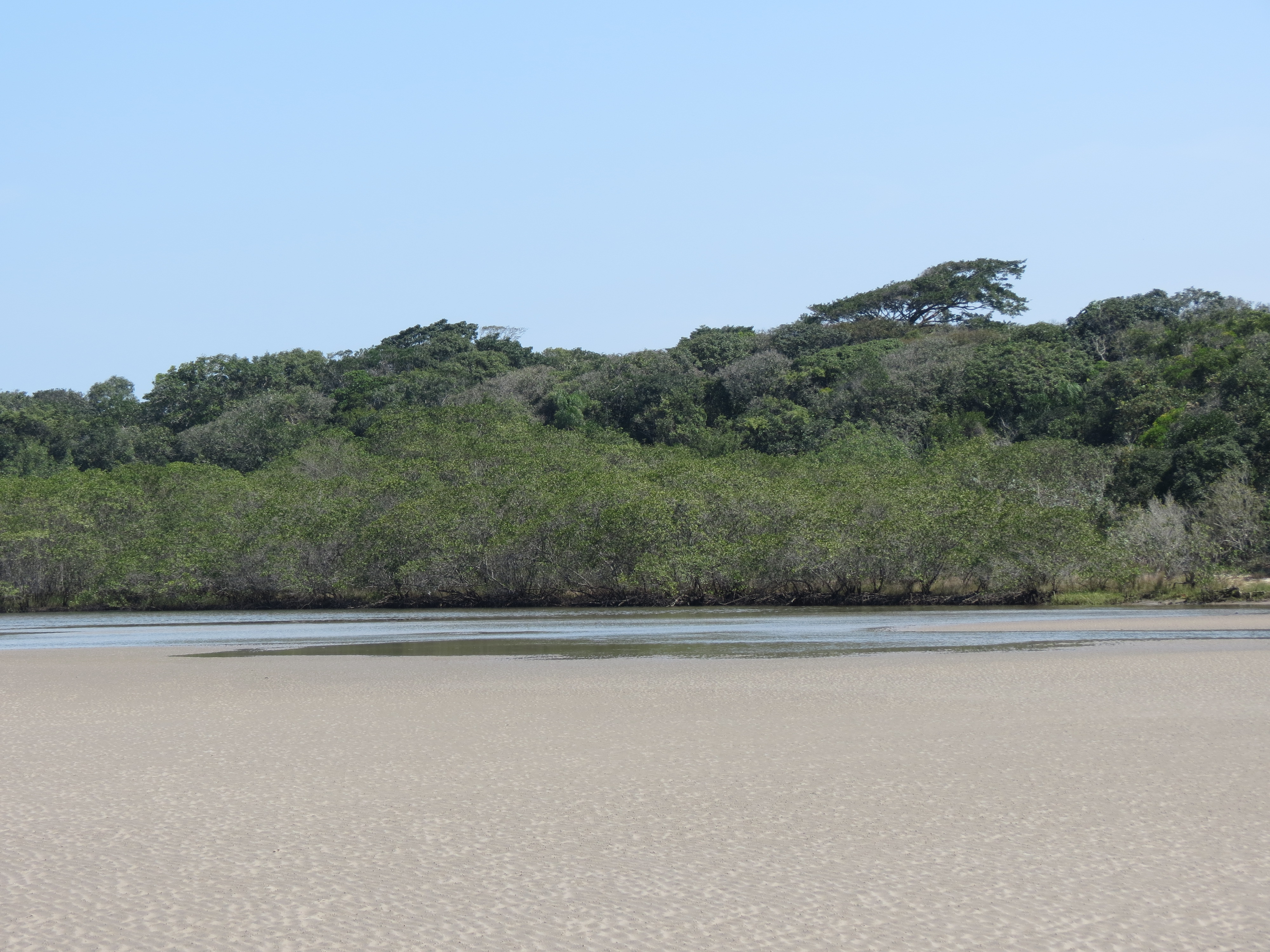
- Restinga and mangroves, Itaguaré beach

- Location within Brazil
- Nearest city: Bertioga, São Paulo
- Coordinates: 23°44′56″S 45°55′54″W
- Area: 9,312.32 ha (35.9551 sq mi)
- Designation: State park
- Created: 9 December 2010
- Administrator: Fundação Florestal - Governo do Estado de São Paulo

The Restinga de Bertioga State Park (Portuguese: Parque Estadual Restinga de Bertioga) is a state park in the state of São Paulo, Brazil. It protects an area of restinga, mangroves and dense rainforest on the coast of São Paulo. The park provides an important ecological corridor from the coastal restinga to the Serra do Mar State Park further inland.

== Location ==
The Restinga de Bertioga State Park is in the municipality of Bertioga, São Paulo. It has an area of 9,312.32 hectares (23,011.2 acres). It contains sambaquis, shell and bone mounds formed by fisher-hunter-gatherer peoples, that date back five thousand years. The park fully protects the Itaguaré and Guaratuba rivers, and about 7 kilometres (4.3 mi) of the Itaguaré, Itaguá and Boracéia beaches.

== Background ==
Brazil's Atlantic Forest is one of the most threatened types of forest in the world. About 7% of the original forest cover remains in the state of São Paulo, of which about 5.98% is on the coast. The state has preserved a large area in the Serra do Mar State Park, the largest Atlantic Forest park in Brazil. However, forest in the coastal region is under great pressure. The 2006 management plan of the Serra do Mar State Park identified the great importance to that park of conserving the continuous areas of restinga in the Bertioga and São Sebastião region. The well-preserved vegetation provides an important ecological corridor leading to the plateau of the Serra do Mar. Boracéia and Barra do Una are rich in birds and amphibians, including large numbers of endangered species.

== History ==
The area now covered by the park was placed under to "provisional administrative limitation" on 30 March 2010 to allow for a period of study of the ecosystems. This bans activities that may cause environmental damage while the area is under study and prevents a race to occupy the land. The study identified the need to protect the "Bertioga Polygon" of 10,393.8 hectares (25,684 acres), including part of the municipality of São Sebastião. It was chosen because it contains examples of flora that are poorly represented among conservation units in SP, with a high level of threat to its integrity and strong social support for its protection. A public consultation was held on 7 October 2010 attended by over 300 people, and lasting for five hours.

The Restinga de Bertioga State Park was created by state decree 56.500 of 9 December 2010. The area had been adjusted to exclude the Guarani indigenous area, urban locations or areas in the process of urbanization, and the results of final studies after the public consultation of 7 October 2010. Areas occupied by federal or state highways, high voltage lines and Petrobras pipelines were excluded from the decree.

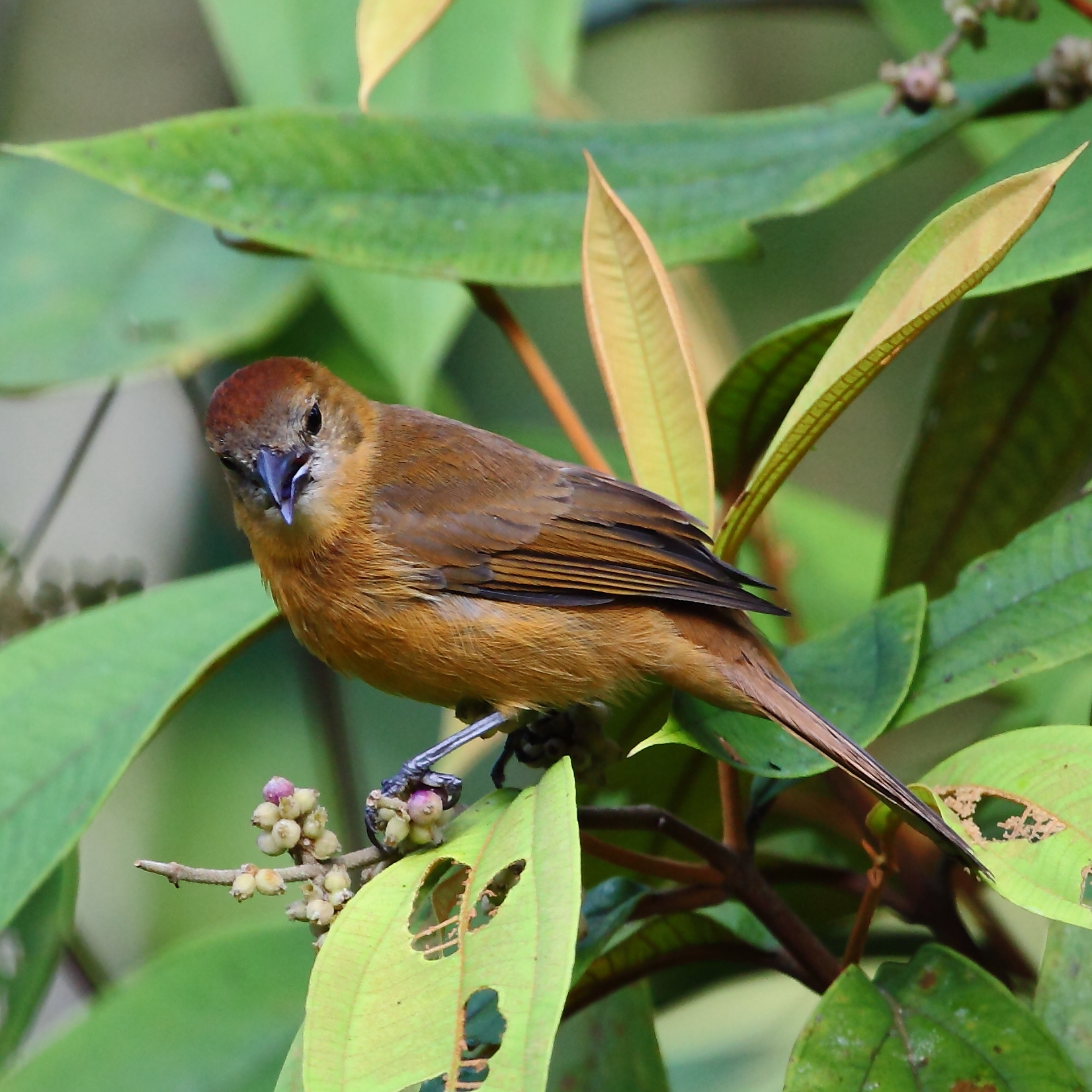
Flame-crested tanager (female)

== Environment ==
Studies carried out by WWF-Brasil and the team preparing the Serra do Mar State Park management plan determined that the park area is an important biological corridor between the coastal marine areas, the restinga and the Serra do Mar. Its protection plays a basic role in guaranteeing long-term viability of the ecology and gene flows. The park contains examples of mangroves, restinga and dense lowland rainforest. It contains 98% of the remaining Baixada Santista restinga forest. It holds 53 species of bromeliads, one third of the total found in the state. 44 plant species are threatened with extinction.

There are 117 species of mammals, of which 25 are medium or large in size. There include cougar (Puma concolor), deer, South American tapir (Tapirus terrestris), ocelot (Leopardus pardalis), southern muriqui (Brachyteles arachnoides), howler monkeys, collared peccary (Pecari tajacu) and white-lipped peccary (Tayassu pecari). There are 69 species of bats, of which six are endangered in the state and one internationally. There are 93 species of reptiles and amphibians, of which 14 are endangered and 14 rare. 117 bird species have been identified, of which 37 are endemic and 9 endangered. BirdLife International considers the area an "Important Bird Area", critically important for conservation and biodiversity of birds in the long term.

== Visiting ==
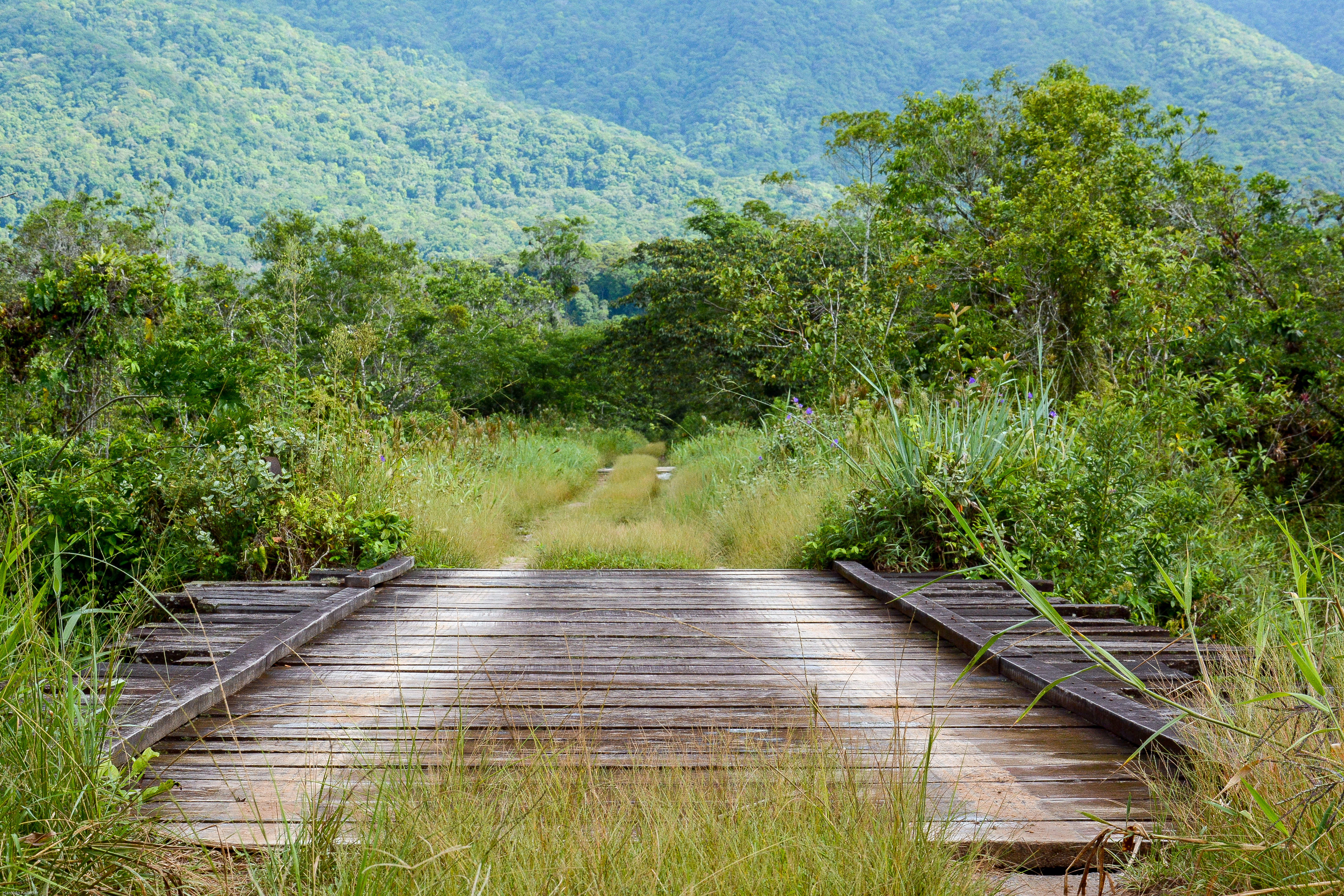
A trail in the park

In February 2015 the park opened two ecotourism trails operated in partnership between the Municipality of Bertioga and the Forest Foundation and regulated by an Emergency Plan for Public Use, created with the park's Consultative Council to meet tourist demand. Accredited monitors accompany visitors in the trails. Both trails are primarily designed to provide access to the restinga and understanding of this rare biome. In the first year of operation visits to the trails were limited to 50 people in the morning and 50 in the afternoon, scheduled through tourist agencies and operators in the town of Bertioga. Unauthorized entry is prohibited.

The 4,140 metres (13,580 ft) Guaratuba Trail is in the Costa do Sol district, accessed through the Condomínio Guaratuba. It includes the Cachoeira de Guaratuba, a waterfall. The 2,700 metres (8,900 ft) Água Trail is in the Praia district, in the "dry mangrove" location, accessed by the old Palmares heart of palm factory. It emphasises environmental education, and also passes the cable line of the Itatinga Hydroelectric Power Plant and the Guaranduva River iron bridge.

== Sources ==
- Ecoturismo em Bertioga (in Portuguese), Riviera de São Lourenço
- Parque Estadual Restinga de Bertioga (SP) (in Portuguese), Instituto Ekos Brasil
- Parque Estadual Restinga de Bertioga (in Portuguese), Fundação Florestal - Governo do Estado de São Paulo
- Parque Estadual Restinga de Bertioga abre duas trilhas para visitação (in Portuguese), Fundação Florestal
