= SP-98 (São Paulo highway) =

State highway in São Paulo, Brazil

SP-098

Route information
- Length: 45.100 km (28.024 mi)

Location
- Country: Brazil
- State: São Paulo

Highway system
- Highways in Brazil; Federal; São Paulo State Highways

The SP-98 is a state highway in the state of São Paulo in Brazil. Its official name is Rodovia Dom Paulo Rolim Loureiro, in honor of the first bishop of the Diocese of Mogi das Cruzes. Also known as the Rodovia Mogi-Bertioga, it connects the municipalities of Mogi das Cruzes, in Greater São Paulo, and Bertioga, in Baixada Santista.
