= Aldeia Itaóca =

- Location in Brazil
- Coordinates: 24°06′00.9″S 46°41′26.6″W
- Country: Brazil

Area
  - Total: 5.2 km^{2} (2 sq mi)
  - Land: 5 km^{2} (1.9 sq mi)

Population (2020)
  - Total: 90
  - Summer (DST): 24°06'00.9"S

Aldeia Itaóca is a Guarani/Guarani Mbya/Guarani Ñandeva Indigenous village located within the municipality of Mongaguá in the state of São Paulo, Brazil. The primary languages spoken are Guarani and Tupi-Guarani.

== History ==
Aldeia Itaóca was established in 1970 by the Fundação Nacional do Índio (FUNAI) to address socio-cultural disintegration among the Guarani-Tupi-Guarani in Brazil.

Aldeia Itaóca is approximately three miles from the southern coast of São Paulo state. It is connected to the neighboring Guarani village of Aldeia Aguapeu (also part of Mongaguá) by the Aguapeu River. Both Itaóca and Aguapeú, located within an Atlantic Forest environmental reserve in Mongaguá, are indigenous villages. The indigenous community of Aguapeú developed the project "Jaguatareí Nhemboé" ("Caminhando e Aprendendo" – "Walking and Learning"), which aims to recognize and value Guarani identity and their Atlantic Forest biome environment. Aldeia Itaóca is also just seven miles from another Guarani settlement called Aldeia Rio Branco, located within the municipality of Itanhaém.

Mongaguá's history dates back to Brazil's colonization when the city belonged for many years to the municipality of São Vicente, the first village founded in Brazil by the Portuguese navigator Martim Afonso de Sousa (1500–1564). In 1624, Mongaguá became part of the Itanhaém township.

== Demographics ==
As of June 2016, Aldeia Itaóca had 127 inhabitants, comprising 78 Guarani and 49 Tupi-Guarani individuals. By 2020, the total registered population had decreased to 90 individuals.

== Flora and Fauna ==
Aldeia Itaóca is situated within the Serra do Mar National Park, part of the Atlantic Forest (Mata Atlântica), and is an ecologically protected area. It is rich in flora and fauna, including many endemic species. Tree species found in the area include Cariniana legalis and Brejaúva palms. Animal species documented within Aldeia Itaóca's 2 square kilometer region include the Yellow-legged thrush (Turdus flavipes) and the Smooth-horned frog (Proceratophrys Miranda-Ribeiro).

== Notable Resident (Danilo Benites) ==
Activist and former Chief of Aldeia Itaóca, Danilo Benites (also known as Vera), has been involved in protecting the rights of Guarani people through his annual statewide event, the Encontro de Jovens Lideranças Guarani do Estado de São Paulo (Meeting of Young Guarani Leaders of the State of São Paulo). The first edition of the event, held in 2017, gathered 60 young people from villages across São Paulo state. “Now we get 100 young people from 24 villages in Brazil. There are also people from Rio de Janeiro, Paraná, Santa Catarina. I am proud to make this meeting grow because despite the name saying ‘State of São Paulo’, the Guarani people have no borders,” says Danilo Benites. “The white man has the Constitution, where our rights are. But he does not respect what is on paper, so we need to teach the young people who are there to defend our struggle.”

Benites states that a primary challenge is engaging young people in discussions and teaching them to utilize available tools, such as social networks, to support their cause. “Rulers, ruralists, and non-indigenous people often allege 'the use of technology' against us, claiming that we are no longer Indigenous. Therefore, we must teach young people to use this technology in favor of our struggle.” During the event, Benites introduced leaders and guests in both Portuguese and Guarani, while also encouraging audience participation. “I have always participated in political discussions and in the events of the elders, mostly by listening. I only learned Portuguese when I was 16 years old. After that, I was able to get more involved and advocate more for our causes.”
