= Le Lavandou =

Le Lavandou Lo Lavandor (Occitan) Lou Lanvandou (Provençal)
- Commune
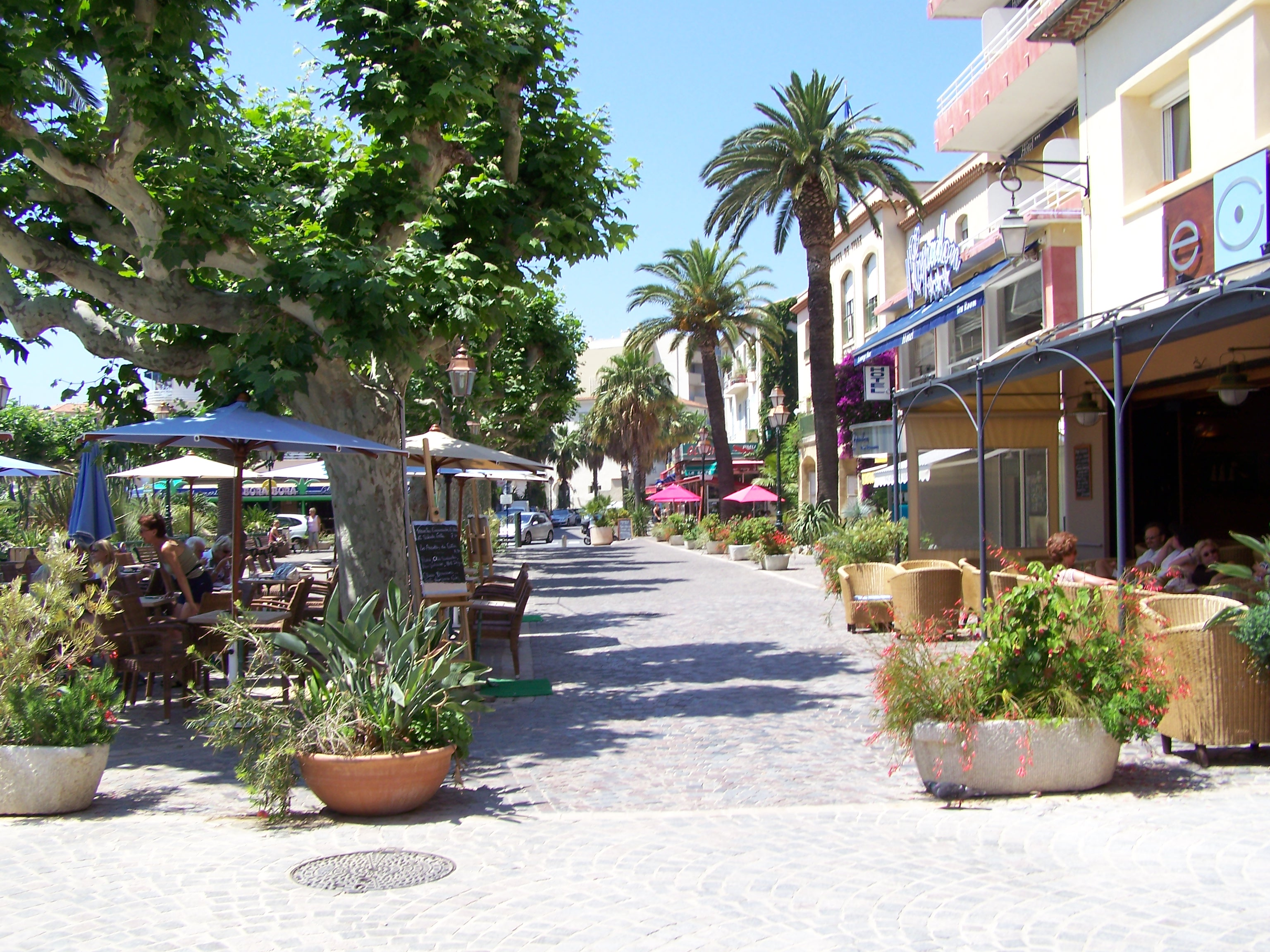
- A view within the commune

- Coat of arms
- Location of Le Lavandou
- Location within France Location within Provence-Alpes-Côte d'Azur
- Coordinates: 43°08′19″N 6°22′06″E
- Country: France
- Region: Provence-Alpes-Côte d'Azur
- Department: Var
- Arrondissement: Toulon
- Canton: La Crau
- Intercommunality: Communauté de communes Méditerranée Porte des Maures

Government
  - Mayor (2020–2026): Gil Bernardi (LR)
- Area^{1}: 29.65 km^{2} (11.45 sq mi)
- Elevation: 10 m (33 ft)
- Highest elevation: 485 m (1,591 ft)
- Lowest elevation: 0 m (0 ft)
- Population (2023): 6,646
  - Density: 224.1/km^{2} (580.5/sq mi)
- Time zone: UTC+01:00 (CET)
  - Summer (DST): UTC+02:00 (CEST)
- INSEE/Postal code: 83070 /83980
- ^{1} French Land Register data, which excludes lakes, ponds, glaciers > 1 km^{2} (0.386 sq mi or 247 acres) and river estuaries.

Le Lavandou (pronounced [lə lavɑ̃du]; Occitan: Lo Lavandor) is a seaside resort town and commune in the Var department in the Provence-Alpes-Côte d'Azur region in Southeastern France. Le Lavandou derives its name either from the flower lavender (lavanda in Provençal) that is prevalent in the area, or more prosaically from the local form of the Occitan name for lavoir, lavandor (for lavador, a public place for washing clothes).

The (then) village is where the famous popular song A Nightingale Sang in Berkeley Square was written in the summer of 1939. The words were by Eric Maschwitz and the music by Manning Sherwin, with its title "stolen" from a story by Michael Arlen. The song had its first performance in a local bar, where the melody was played on piano by Sherwin with the help of the resident saxophonist. Maschwitz sang the words while holding a glass of wine, but nobody seemed impressed.

In the spring of 2002, an attempt was made to find the bar where this classic song was first performed with the view to having a blue plaque set up. With the help of the local tourist office, elderly residents were questioned, but it proved impossible to establish the venue.

In September 2000, the mayor passed an unusual bylaw making it illegal to die in the town. The mayor described his own bylaw as "absurd ... to counter an absurd situation"; the "absurd situation" was that with the town's cemetery already full, a court in Nice had denied permission for a new cemetery because it would mar the beauty of the selected site.

After the fall of nobility, the title of Duke of Lavandou was passed on the Governor of Provence and Languedoc, and from there by primogeniture to the Duchess of Gandia. She married Lev Obolensky in 1980 and had a son, Arnaud Henry Salas-Perez, Prince Obolensky, who became Duke of Gandia, Languedoc and Lavandou, making a Russian prince the titleholder for Le Lavandou.

== Demographics ==
Historical population
Year	Pop.	±% p.a.
1968	3,271	—
1975	3,798	+2.16%
1982	4,269	+1.68%
1990	5,212	+2.53%
1999	5,449	+0.50%
2007	5,825	+0.84%
2012	5,165	−2.38%
2017	5,985	+2.99%
2023	6,646	+1.76%
Source: INSEE

== Twin towns – sister cities ==
Le Lavandou has been twinned with Kronberg, Germany, since 1973.

== Events ==
- Lavandou Flower Parade
- Saint-Pierre festival
- Romérage
- Summer season concerts
- Halloween | Fall Festival

== Beaches ==
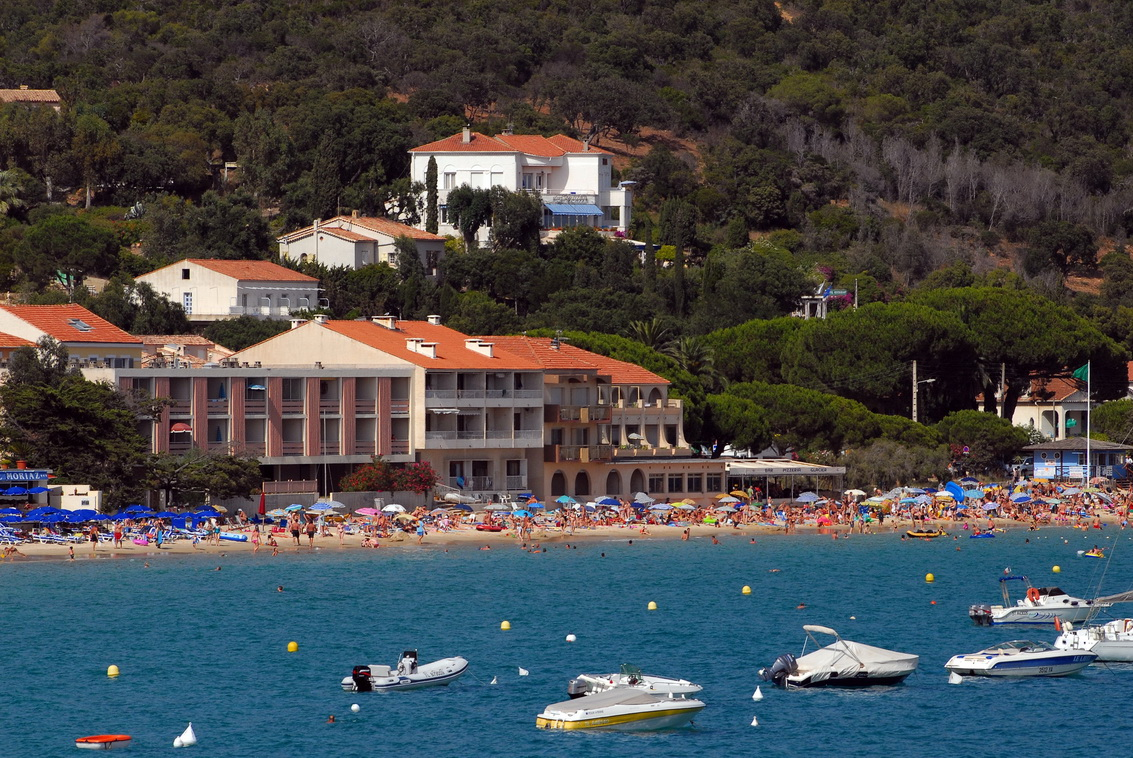
Beach Cavaliere

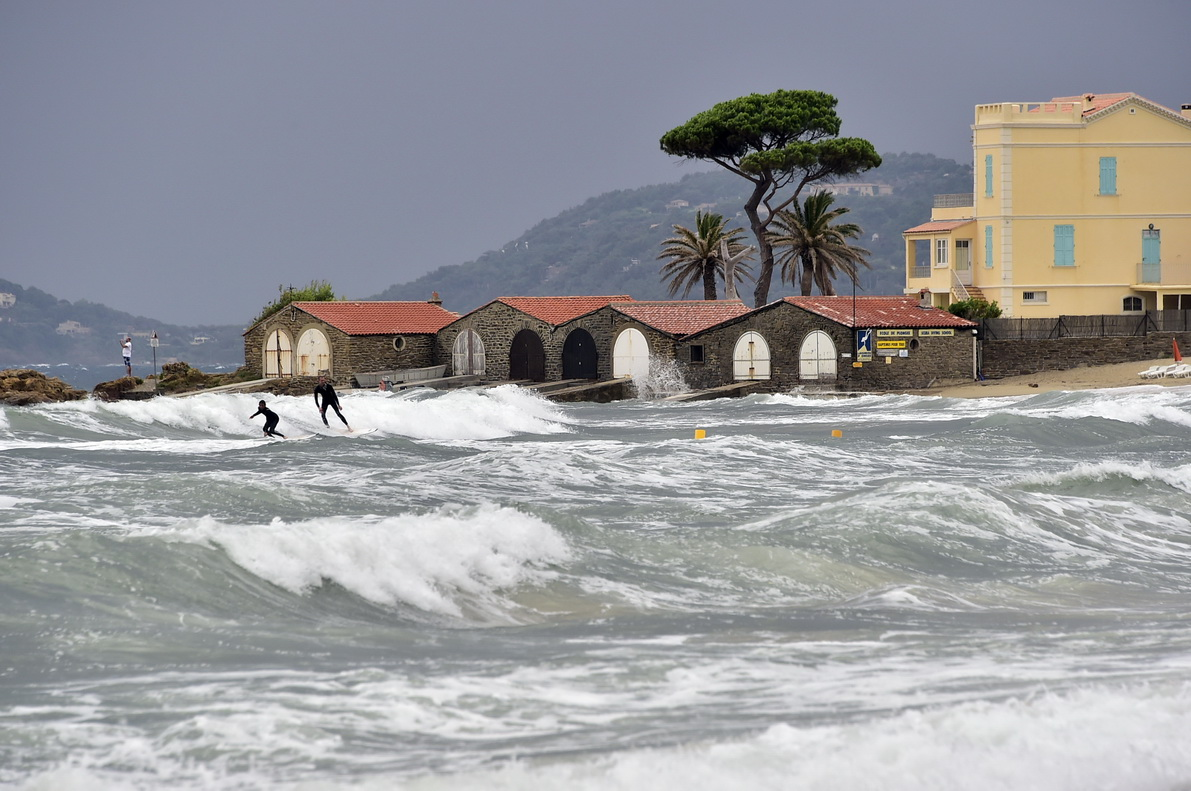
Beach Saint-Clair

- L'Anglade
- La Grande Plage du Lavandou
- Saint-Clair
- La Fossette
- Aiguebelle
- l'Eléphant
- Jean Blanc
- Rossignol
- Le Layet
- Cavalière
- Cap Nègre
- Pramousquier

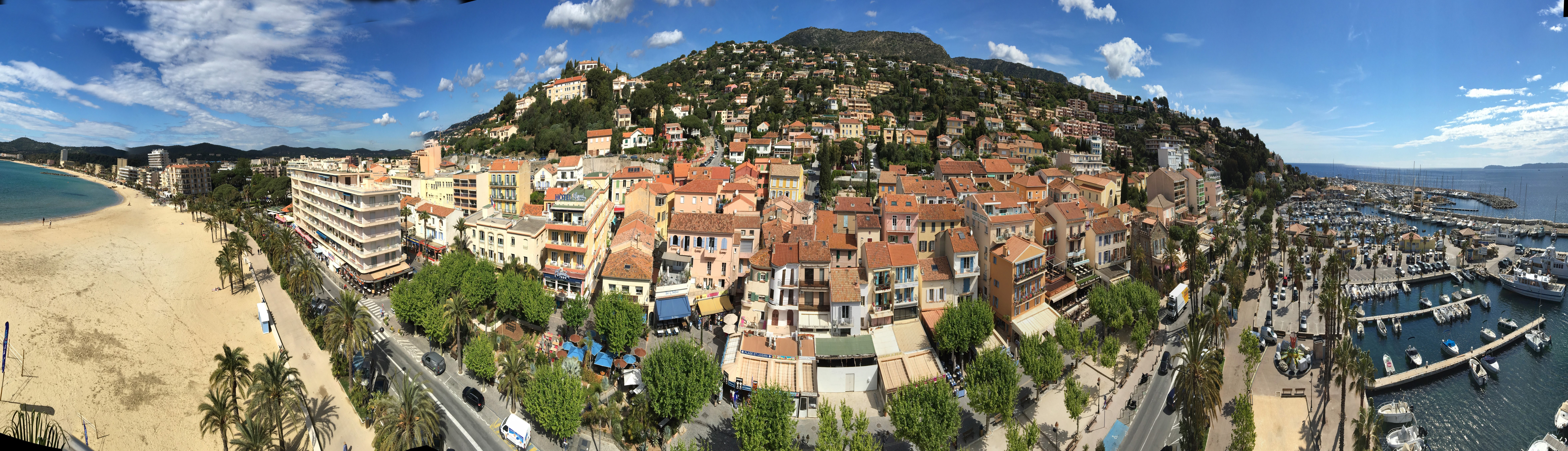
Panoramic view of Le Lavandou (2017-05)

== See also ==
- Communes of the Var department
