= Salesópolis =

- Municipality
- Municipality of Salesópolis
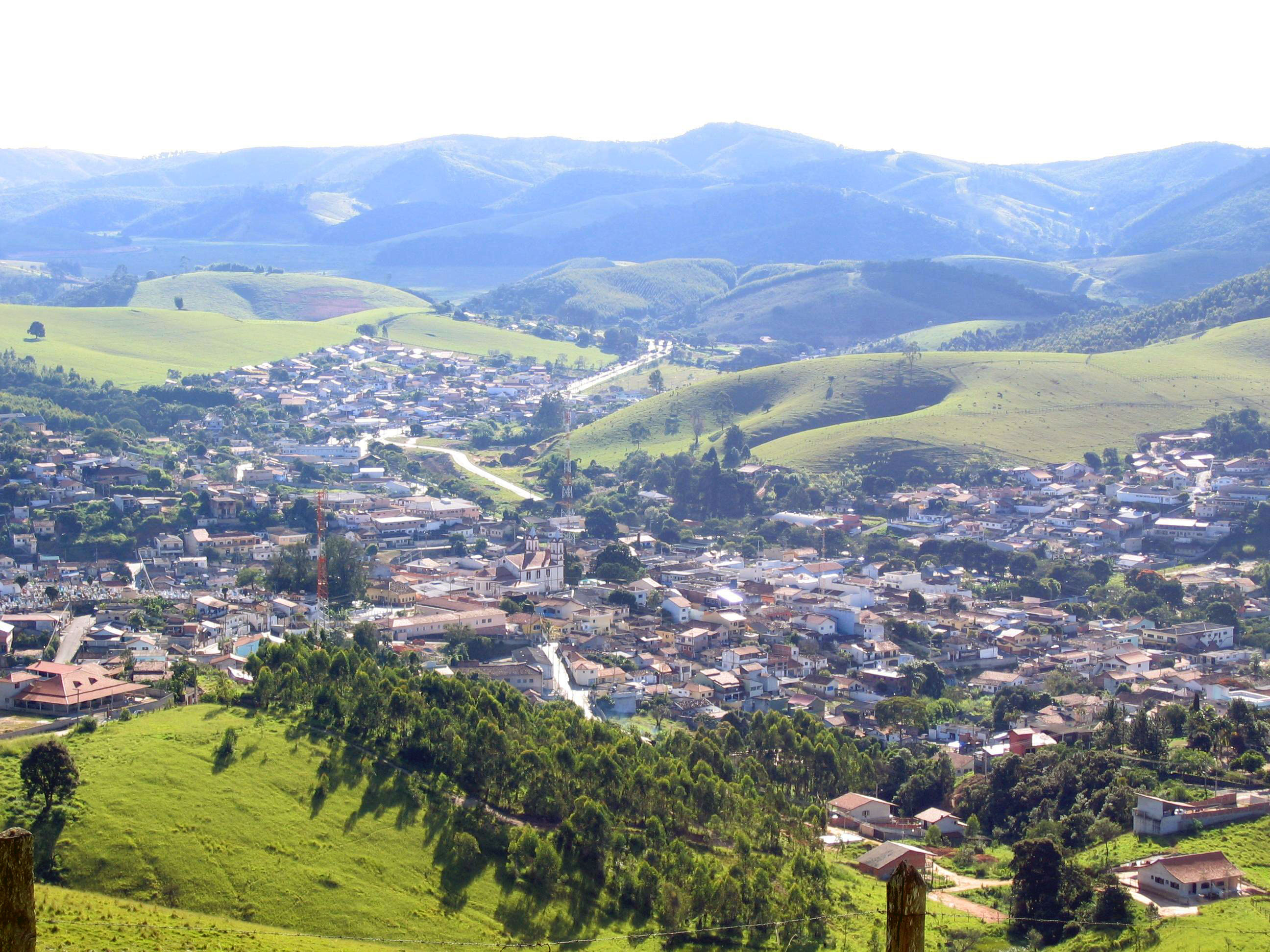
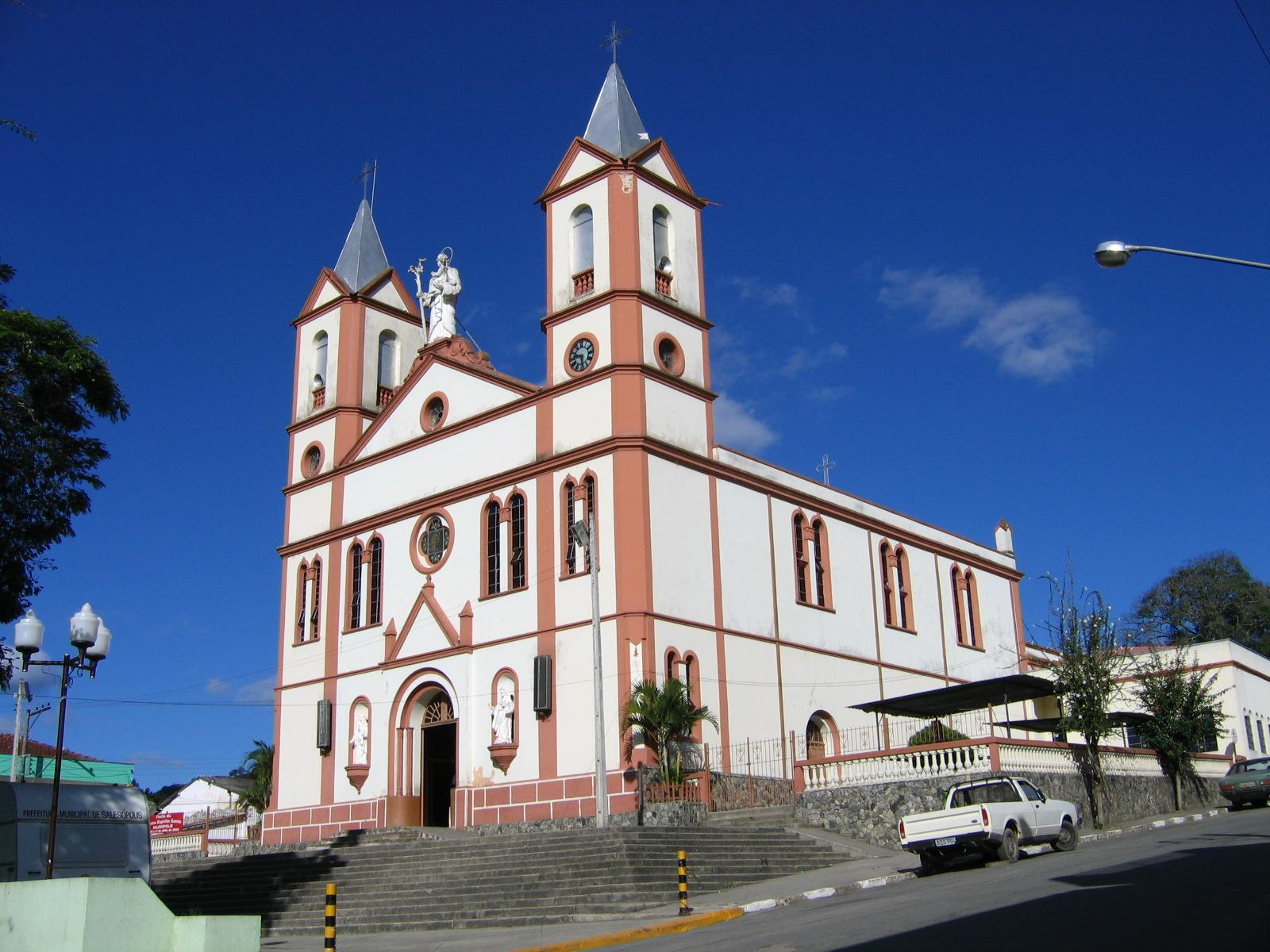
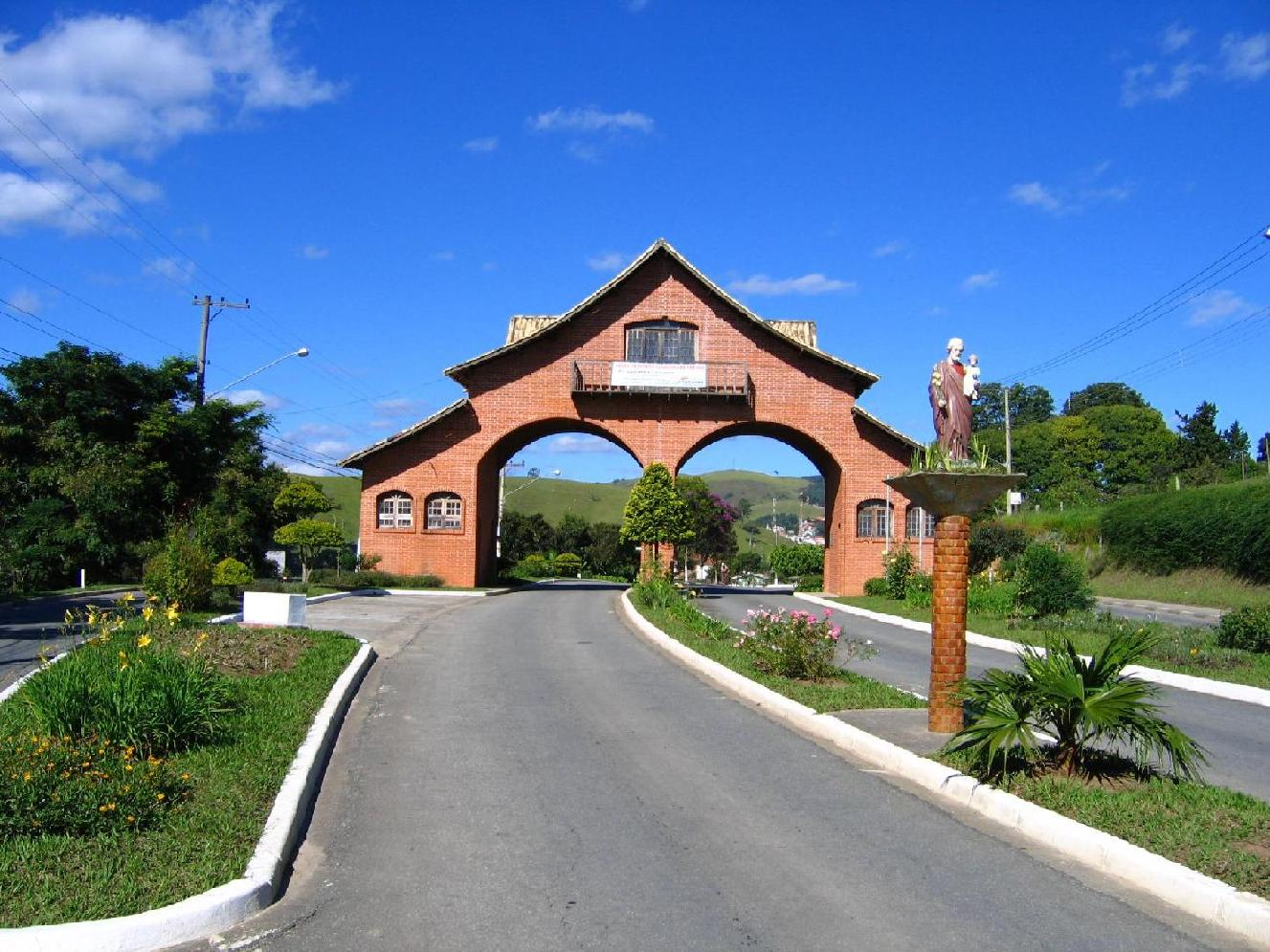
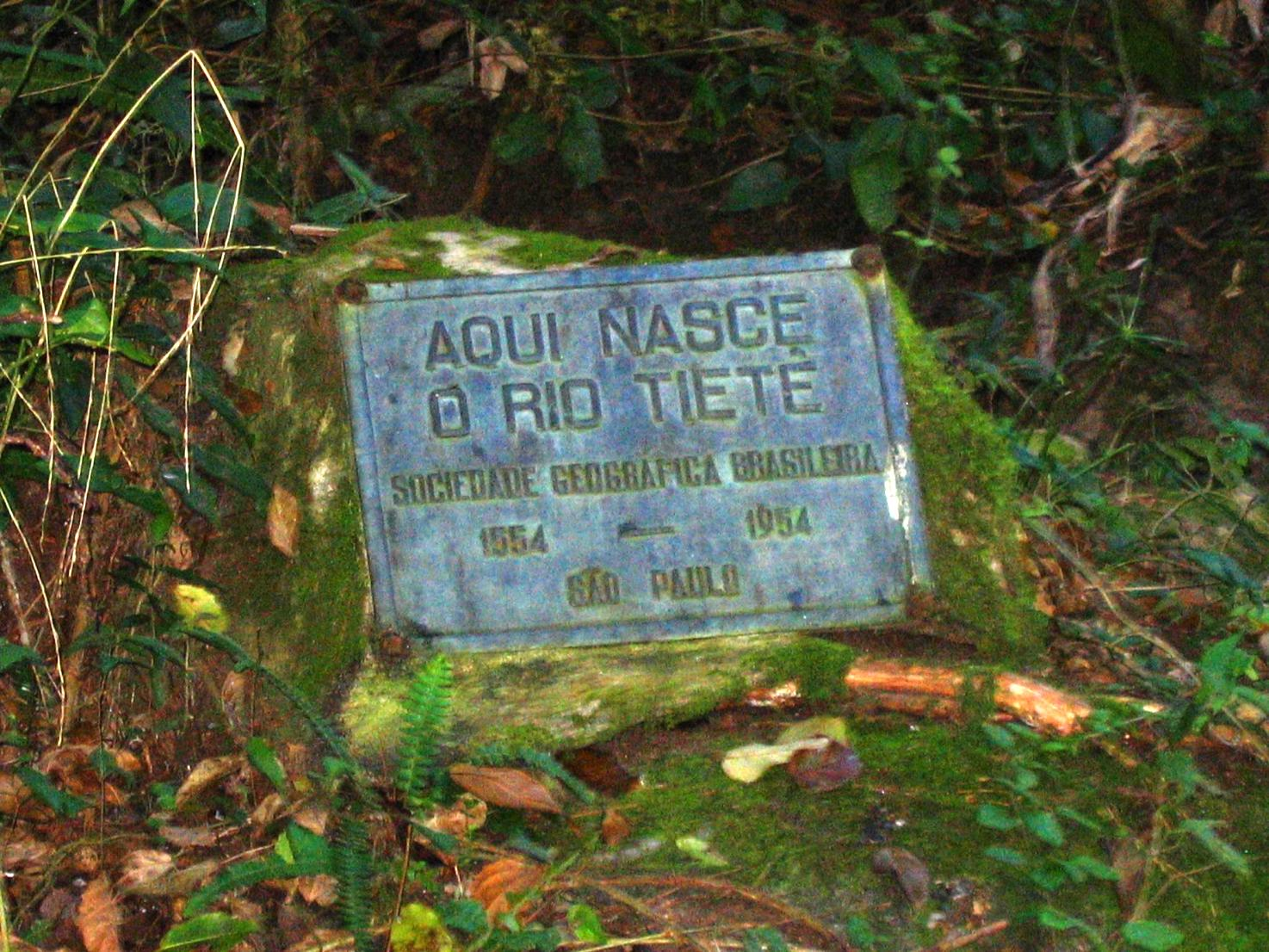
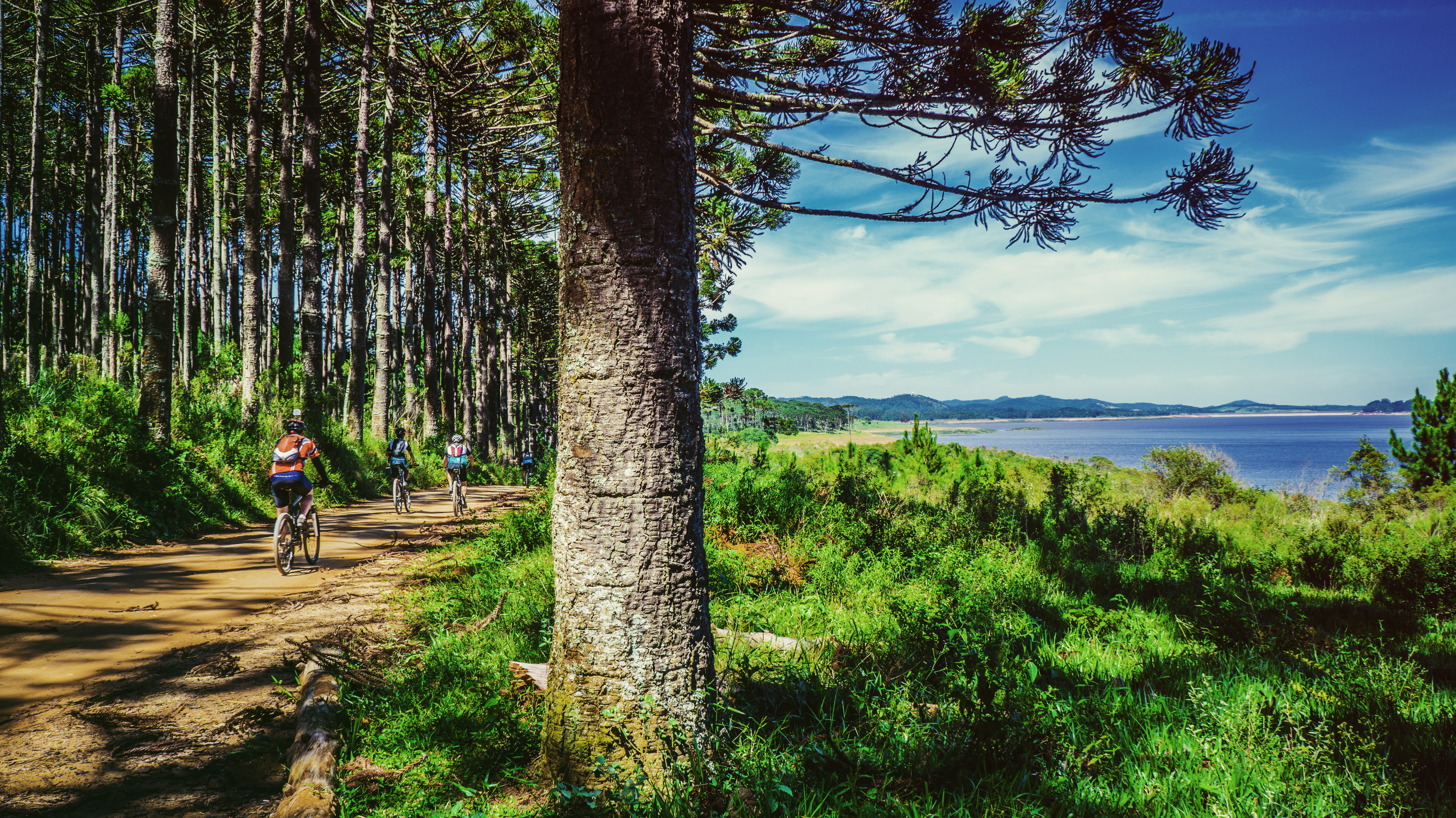

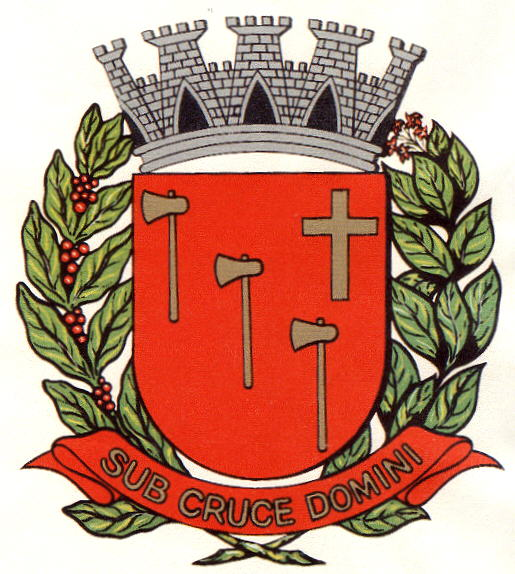
- Flag Coat of arms

- Location of Salesópolis

- Location within Brazil
- Coordinates: 23°50′46″S 46°37′47″W
- Country: Brazil
- Region: Southeast
- State: São Paulo

Government
  - Mayor: Vanderlon Oliveira Gomes (PL)

Area
  - Total: 424.997 km^{2} (164.092 sq mi)
- Elevation: 850 m (2,790 ft)

Population (2020)
  - Total: 17,252
  - Density: 40.593/km^{2} (105.14/sq mi)
- Time zone: UTC−3 (BRT)
- HDI (2010): 0.732 – high
- Website: www.salesopolis.sp.gov.br

Salesópolis is a Brazilian municipality in the state of São Paulo, located at the eastern edge of the São Paulo Metropolitan Region of São Paulo, within the Upper Tietê River Basin, approximately 100 kilometres from the state capital. The municipality comprises the main town and the district of Nossa Senhora dos Remédios.

Salesópolis is one of the areas in the region that still features extensive native vegetation, while also experiencing the typical pressures of both urban and rural zones, including illegal land subdivision, as well as unregulated agroforestry and tourism activities.

Six notable characteristics stand out in Salesópolis:

1. The still-preserved natural environment and relatively small urban area
2. The headwaters of the Tietê River, which remain little known despite the national importance of this watercourse
3. The presence of reservoirs and islands, with about eighty miles of shoreline, regarded as assets of aesthetic and scenic value
4. The proximity to the Serra do Mar and the inclusion of its territory within the Serra do Mar State Park
5. The extensive reforestation with eucalyptus
6. The horticulture and fruit farming found in the municipality, particularly around the District of Nossa Senhora dos Remédios.

Salesópolis was founded in the 19th century as São José do Paraitinga, and later became the parish of Santana de Mogi das Cruzes in 1838. The parish was elevated to municipality status on March 24, 1857, but renamed Salesópolis in 1905 after a visit of the president of Brazil, Campos Sales (1841–1913).

== Demographic Profile ==
- Total population: 15,202
- Men: 7,525
- Women: 7,677
- Population density: 35.77/km^{2} (92.6/sq mi)
- Residents in urban areas: 9,750
- Residents in rural areas: 5,452
- Residents identified with disabilities: 7%
- Residents identified with autism: 1.1%
- Literacy: 11,618 (94%)

=== Means of transport used to get to work ===
- On foot: 1,708
- Bicycle: 224
- Motorcycle: 811
- Car: 1,740
- Bus: 1,032
- Train/Metro: 21

=== Religion ===
- Roman Catholic: 9,670
- Protestant: 2,136
- Other religions: 893
- No religion: 647

=== Education level ===
- No schooling and incomplete primary education: 4,345
- Complete primary and incomplete secondary education: 1,738
- Complete secondary and incomplete higher education: 4,200
- Complete higher education: 1,393

=== Municipal characteristics ===
- 56.16% connected to the sewage system
- 61.44% supplied by the public water network
- 99.81% have a private bathroom
- 89.53% have waste collection

=== Colour or race ===
- White: 11,369
- Black: 395
- Asian: 107
- Brown (mixed race): 3,327
- Indigenous: 4

=== Religion ===
As shown by the 2022 Census, the municipality is predominantly Roman Catholic (72.5% of the population). This influence is evident in the town's historical heritage—such as the Main Church—and in its cultural life, which largely revolves around religious events like the Feast of the Holy Spirit and celebrations of specific saints dating back to the town's foundation.

Other inhabitants belong to various Protestant denominations (16%) and other faiths (6.7%), including Afro-Brazilian religions, Kardecist Spiritism, Mormons, and Jehovah's Witnesses. Some of these groups hold their worship services in other municipalities. There are no records of adherents of Judaism, Islam, or Eastern religions in Salesópolis. There are also no significant events involving these religious denominations in the municipality.

There has also been a noticeable growth in the number of people without any religious affiliation (4.8%), including atheists, agnostics, and those who simply do not identify with an organised religion.

== Geography ==
The boundaries of Salesópolis are Santa Branca to the north, Paraibuna to the northeast, Caraguatatuba to the east, São Sebastião to the southeast, Bertioga to the south, Biritiba-Mirim to the west, and Guararema to the northwest.

The Upper Tietê River Basin covers nearly the same area as the Metropolitan Region of Greater São Paulo, with a total area of about 2,310 sq mi (6,000 km^{2}), and is composed of 34 municipalities. Salesópolis, located within this basin and about 60 mi (97 km) from the state capital, has an area of approximately 164 sq mi (420 km^{2}), with 98% of its territory lying within the Protection and Recovery Area of Water Sources (APRM-ATC).

The region’s terrain is characterised by hills and rolling uplands, with altitudes ranging from roughly 2,430 to 3,610 ft (740 to 1,100 m), and the Serra do Mar mountain range standing out in the southern, southeastern, and southwestern parts of the area. Floodplains can be found along the lower stretches of the rivers.

The Tietê River Basin has two main tributaries. The Claro River, whose basin was expropriated by the state government, flows into the Tietê River, and its waters are dammed by the Ponte Nova Reservoir. The Paraitinga River rises in Paraibuna, passes through urban areas, and flows into the Tietê River in the municipality of Biritiba Mirim.

The Tietê River is the main source of public water supply for the Metropolitan Region of São Paulo. Its source lies at an altitude of around 3,380 ft (1,030 m), among the crystalline rocks of the Atlantic Plateau, in the district of Pedra Rajada, springing from several natural springs emerging from a sandy layer.

== See also ==
- List of municipalities in São Paulo
