= Mongaguá =

- Flag Coat of arms
- Motto(s): E pluribus unum "Out of Many, One"
- Location in the state of São Paulo and the country of Brazil.
- Coordinates: 24°05′15″S 46°37′44″W
- Country: Brazil
- State: São Paulo
- Founded: 17 December 1959; 66 years ago

Government
  - Mayor: [Cristina wiaskoki

Area
  - Total: 141.87 km^{2} (54.78 sq mi)
- Elevation: 8 m (26 ft)

Population (2020)
  - Total: 57,648
  - Density: 406.34/km^{2} (1,052.4/sq mi)
- Time zone: UTC−3 (BRT)
- Website: mongagua.sp.gov.br

Mongaguá is a municipality in the state of São Paulo in Brazil. It is part of the Metropolitan Region of Baixada Santista. The population is 57,648 (2020 est.) in an area of 141.87 km^{2}. The name comes from the Tupi language. Its seal carries the motto "E pluribus unum".

The municipality's street plan is on a planned grid running from SSE to NNW and many of the houses are within sight of the Atlantic Ocean. The populated area of Mongaguá is near the bottom of steep-sloping and densely forested mountains. The BR-101 superhighway linking Santos and the southern part of the state runs through Mongaguá. The freeway to the city of São Paulo is also easily accessible. Housing developments near the beaches were built in the 1970s and the 1990s. Prior to the construction of the housing developments, the population was mainly rural. Housing development continues to this day.

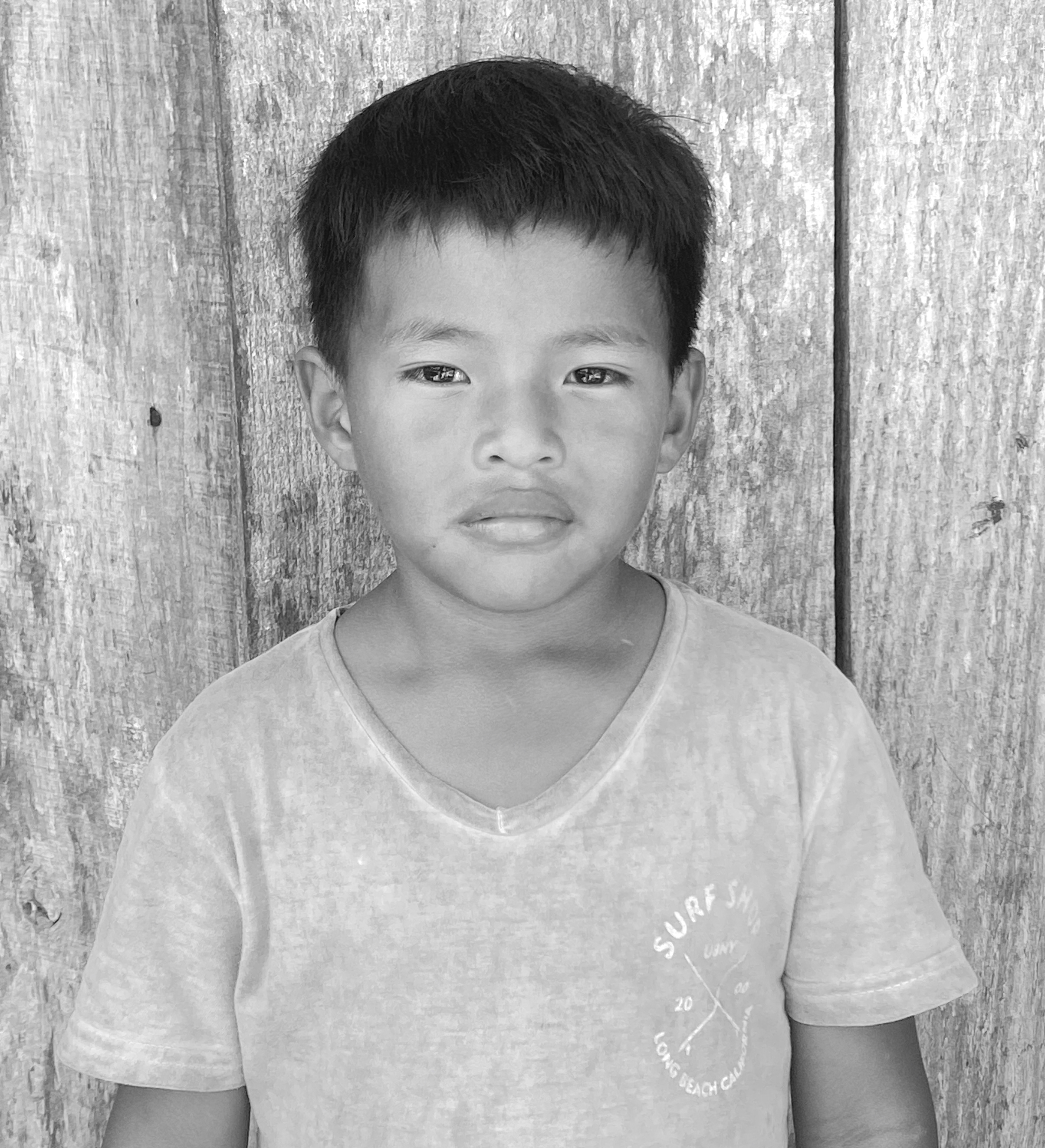
Karaí Mirim (Pequeno Sábio), Guarani resident of Aldeia Itaóca

There are at least three aboriginal villages in Mongaguá: Aldeia Itaóca, Aguapéu and Cerro Corá all which are located in the Atlantic Mata reserve. The aboriginal community of Aguapéu conceived of the project Jaguatareí Nhemboé (Walking and Learning).

== History ==
=== Pre-colonial era ===
Around the year 1000, the region was invaded by Tupi peoples from the Amazon. They expelled the previous inhabitants, called Tapuias, to the interior of the continent. When the first Europeans arrived in the region in the 16th century, the Guaranis lived on the banks of the Mongaguá and Aguapeú rivers.

== Population history ==
Year	Population
2004	43,383
2006	46,977
2015	52,492

== Mongaguá Fishing Pier ==
The concrete Mongaguá Fishing Pier (or Plataforma de Pesca Amadora de Mongaguá) is a long T-shaped structure that provides access to line fishing as well as being a popular surfing area.

== Media ==
In telecommunications, the city was served by the Telecomunicações de São Paulo. In July 1998, this company was acquired by Telefónica, which adopted the Vivo brand in 2012. The company is currently an operator of cell phones, fixed lines, internet (fiber optics/4G) and television (satellite and cable).

== Forest ==
As of 2020, according to the website Global Forest Watch, 80% of Mongaguá's territory was forested (Atlantic Forest), a 1% decrease from the previous decade.

== Notable residents ==
Raul Seixas, the "Father of Brazilian rock" was known to spend large amounts of time in Bairro Pedreira in Mongaguá where for years he rented a small bungalo as a songwriting studio. The artist, surfer and conservationist Frégs, grew up and resides in Mongaguá. And since 2010, the Greek-Californian artist and musician Ithaka Darin Pappas has worked and resided in Mongaguá at his small art ranch called Recanto Akahti (or AkahtiLândia, Brazil). His insect-inspired photo and sculpture works from the project Aliens Of AkahtiLândia were all created in Mongaguá as well as the recording of his instrumental album, Voiceless Blue Raven, which included a song entitled "Monday In Mongaguá."

== See also ==
- List of municipalities in São Paulo
