= Cubatão =

City in São Paulo, Brazil

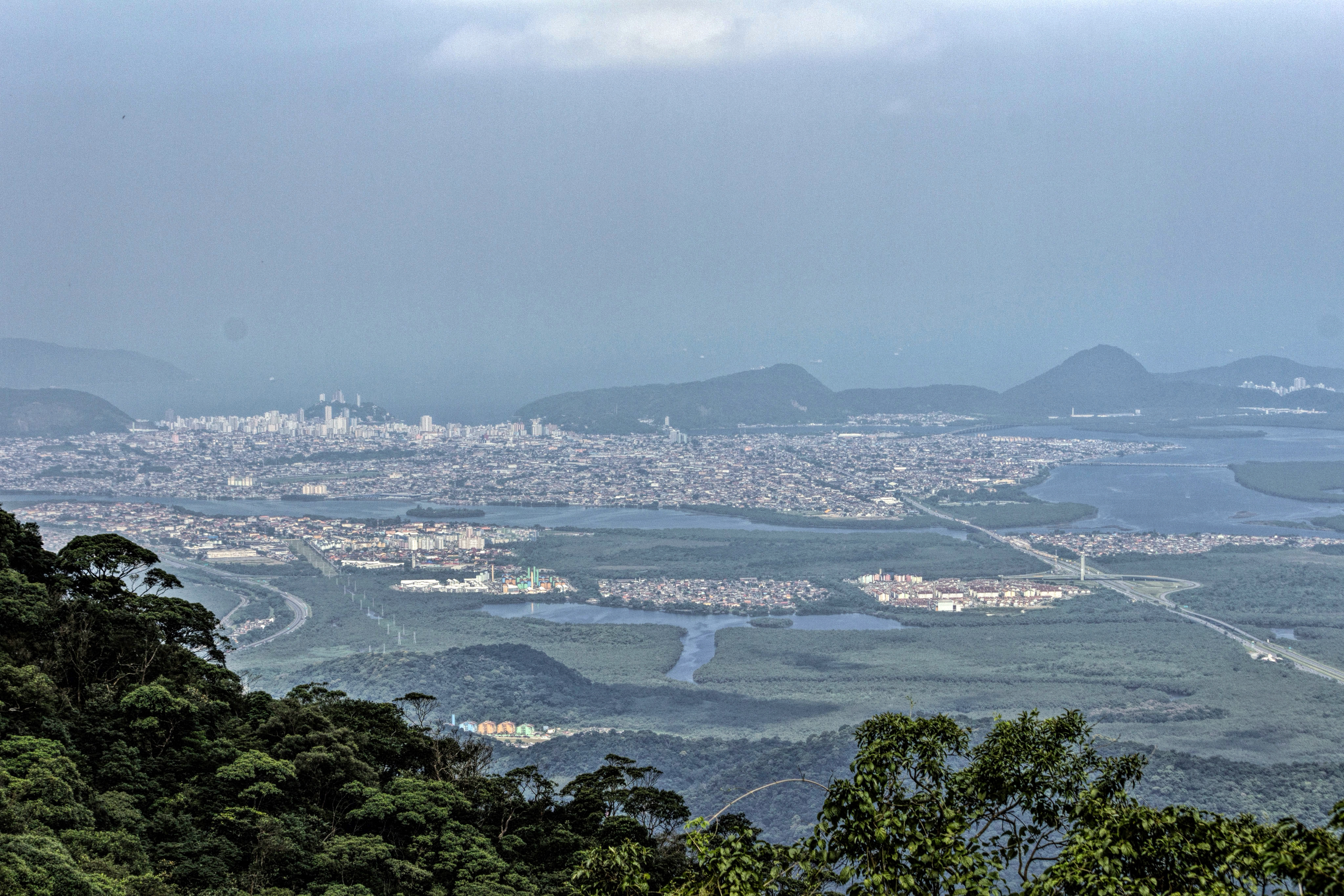
- Aerial view of Cubatão

- Flag Coat of arms

- Location of Cubatão

- Location in Brazil
- Coordinates: 23°53′43″S 46°25′32″W
- Country: Brazil
- Region: Southeast
- State: São Paulo
- Metropolitan Region: Baixada Santista
- Founded: 9 April 1833; 193 years ago
- Anniversary: 9 April 1949; 77 years ago

Government
  - Mayor: César da Silva Nascimento (PSD)

Area
  - Total: 142.88 km^{2} (55.17 sq mi)
- Elevation: 4 m (13 ft)

Population (2022 Census)
  - Total: 112,476
  - Estimate (2025): 114,870
  - Density: 787.21/km^{2} (2,038.9/sq mi)
- Time zone: UTC-3 (BRT)
  - Summer (DST): UTC-2 (BRST)
- HDI (2000): 0,772 – medium
- Website: Cubatão

Cubatão is a city in the state of São Paulo, Brazil, 12 kilometers away from Santos seaport, the largest in Latin America. It is part of the Metropolitan Region of the Baixada Santista. The population is 112,476 (2022 Census) in an area of 143.649 km^{2}. It hosts industries, refining oil, steel mills and fertilizers.

== History ==
The municipality was created by state law in 1948.

Map of the state of São Paulo (1948).

In the early 1980s, Cubatão was one of the most polluted cities in the world, nicknamed "Valley of Death", due to births of brainless children and respiratory, hepatic and blood illnesses. High air pollution was killing forest over hills around the city. It was ranked the top ten dirtiest cities in the world by Popular Science.

Around 0:00 BRT (3:00 GMT) on Saturday, 25 February 1984, an oil spill set the shantytown Vila Socó on fire, killing 93 people according to official figures of the government, though the actual death toll may be more than 200. The contamination of workers with persistent organic pollutants put the now defunct Rhodia into Greenpeace's top 10 world's worst corporate crimes ever in its report to Rio Summit in 1992.

Strong efforts were made to diminish pollution in the city, costing US$ 1.2 billion so far. Although conditions have improved, it is impossible to completely clean the contaminated soil and groundwater. Furthermore, as long as large industries continue to work in such a small area, there will always be some pollution.

== Popular culture ==
Cubatão was mentioned as the "world's most polluted town" in the Jello Biafra-Sepultura collaboration "Biotech is Godzilla" on the group's 1993 album Chaos A.D.

Cubatão is the name of an A La Carte song from 1981.

== Sister cities ==
- Taquaritinga, Brazil (1972)
- Conchal, Brazil (1986)
- Peruíbe, Brazil (1991)
- Serra Negra, Brazil (1991)
- Águas de São Pedro, Brazil (1991)
- Aveiro, Portugal (1992)
- Melipilla, Chile (2005)

== Divisions ==
=== Piaçaguera ===
Piaçaguera is a location within the city of Cubatão in the state of São Paulo, Brazil. The Rodovia Cônego Domênico Rangoni highway, formerly known as the Piaçaguera-Guarujá highway, starts there. It connects the Via Anchieta to Guarujá, crossing the Bertioga canal. It is there that the climb through the Serra do Mar escarpment begins by way of the Santos-Jundiaí railway line.

"Piaçaguera" is a term from the Tupi language that means "old port" by way of the conjunction of the two words "peasaba" ("port") and "ûera" ("velho").

== Media ==
In telecommunications, the city was served by the Companhia Telefônica da Borda do Campo until 1975, when it began to be served by the Telecomunicações de São Paulo. In July 1998, this company was acquired by Telefónica, which adopted the Vivo brand in 2012.

The company is currently an operator of cell phones, fixed lines, internet (fiber optics/4G) and television (satellite and cable).

== See also ==
- List of municipalities in São Paulo
