= Biritiba-Mirim =

Biritiba Mirim
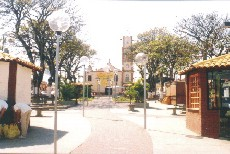
- Biritiba Mirim plaza

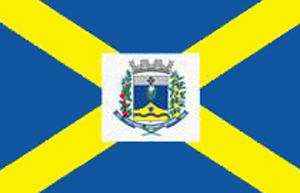
- Flag Coat of arms

- Location of Biritiba Mirim

- Location within Brazil
- Coordinates: 23°34′22″S 46°02′20″W
- Country: Brazil
- Region: Southeast
- State: São Paulo
- Metropolitan Region: São Paulo

Government
  - Mayor: Carlos Alberto Taino Junior (PL)

Area
  - Total: 317.41 km^{2} (122.55 sq mi)

Population (2020)
  - Total: 32,936
  - Density: 86.77/km^{2} (224.7/sq mi)
- Time zone: UTC−3 (BRT)
- HDI (2000): 0,750 – medium
- Website: Biritiba Mirim

Biritiba Mirim is a Brazilian municipality of the state of São Paulo. It is part of the Metropolitan Region of São Paulo. The population is 32,936 (2020 est.) in an area of 317.41 km^{2} (122.55 sq mi). Its limits are Guararema in the north, Salesópolis in the east, Bertioga to the south and Mogi das Cruzes in the west and northwest.

== Demographics ==
Historical population (municipality)
| Year | Population | %± |
|---|---|---|
| 1970 | 9,033 | — |
| 1980 | 13,374 | 48.1% |
| 1991 | 17,833 | 33.3% |
| 2000 | 24,653 | 38.2% |
| 2010 | 28,575 | 15.9% |
| 2022 | 29,683 | 3.9% |
| Est. 2024 | 30,526 | 2.8% |

== Media ==
In telecommunications, the city was served by Companhia de Telecomunicações do Estado de São Paulo until 1973, when it began to be served by Companhia Telefônica da Borda do Campo. In July 1998, this company was acquired by Telefónica, which adopted the Vivo brand in 2012.

The company is currently an operator of cell phones, fixed lines, internet (fiber optics/4G) and television (satellite and cable).

== See also ==
- List of municipalities in São Paulo
