= Bertioga =

- Municipality
- Municipality of Bertioga
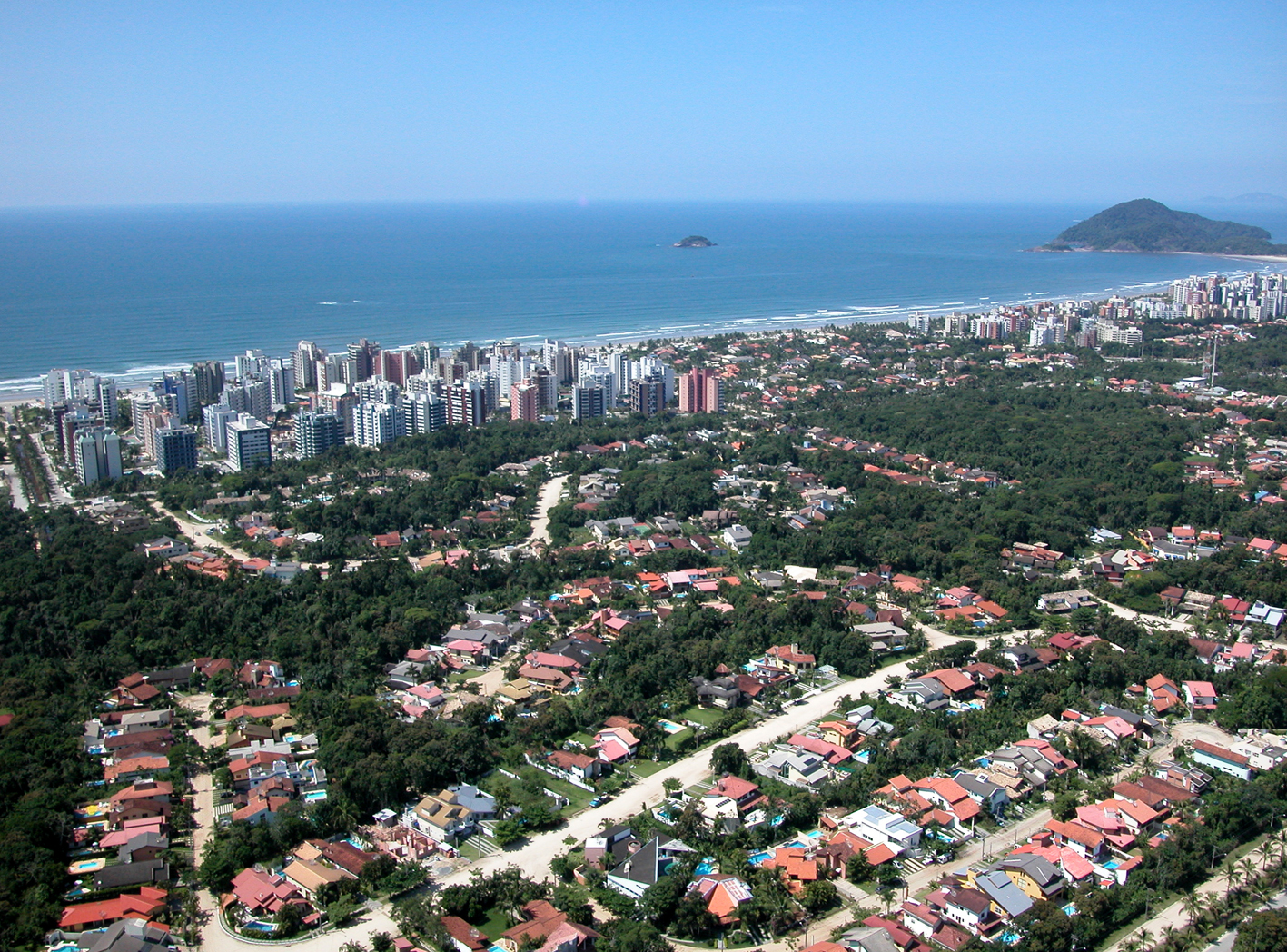

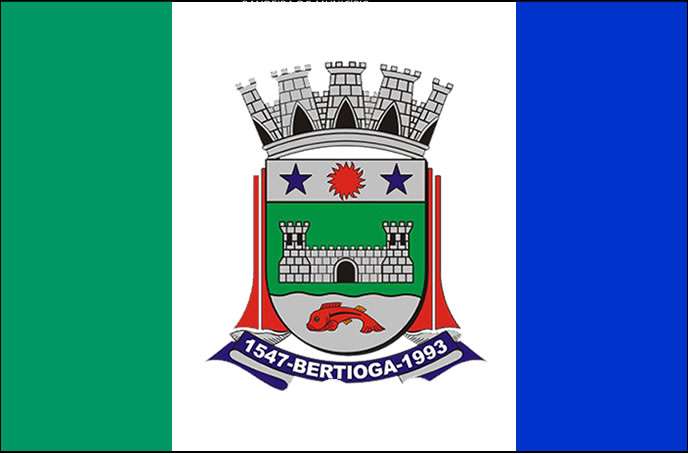
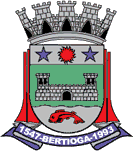
- Flag Coat of arms

- Location in São Paulo
- Coordinates: 23°51′17″S 46°08′20″W
- Country: Brazil
- Region: Southeast
- State: São Paulo
- Metropolitan Region: Baixada Santista

Government
  - Mayor: Marcelo Villares

Area
  - Total: 490.15 km^{2} (189.25 sq mi)
- Elevation: 8 m (26 ft)

Population (2020)
  - Total: 64,723
  - Density: 132.05/km^{2} (342.00/sq mi)
- Time zone: UTC−3 (BRT)
- HDI (2010): 0.730 – high
- Website: bertioga.sp.gov.br

Bertioga is a Brazilian municipality in the state of São Paulo and part of the Baixada Santista Metropolitan Region. Its population is 64,723 (2020 est.) in an area of 490.15 km^{2}. Because it neighbors resort towns, its population fluctuates greatly with the seasons. The more northern parts are densely forested and unpopulated.

== History ==
The municipality was created by state law on 19 May 1991, from a part of Santos.

== Geography ==
The municipality contains the 9,312 hectares (23,010 acres) Restinga de Bertioga State Park, created in 2010 to protect an area of mangroves, restinga and rainforest. Its limits are Mogi das Cruzes, Biritiba-Mirim and Salesópolis in the north, São Sebastião in the east, Atlantic Ocean to the south with Ilha de Santo Amaro (opposite the city) and Santos in the west.

== Demographics ==
Historical population (municipality)
Year	Population	%±
2000	30,039	—
2010	47,645	58.6%
2022	64,188	34.7%

== Media ==
Bertioga was served telecommunications by the Companhia Telefônica Brasileira until 1973, when the Telecomunicações de São Paulo took over. In July 1998, it was acquired by Telefónica, which adopted the Vivo brand in 2012. It now sells and operates cell phones, fixed lines, internet access (fiber optic and 4G) and television reception (satellite and cable).

== Trivia ==
Bertioga is where Josef Mengele, a Nazi Germany doctor at Auschwitz, drowned in 1979.

== See also ==
- List of municipalities in São Paulo
