= Baixada Santista =

Metropolitan area in São Paulo state

Coordinates: 23°57′39″S 46°20′02″W

Santista Lowlands Metropolitan Region Região Metropolitana da Baixada Santista
- Metropolitan Area
- Baixada Santista location in São Paulo state

- Location within Brazil
- Country: Brazil
- Created: 30 July 1996

Population (2021)
  - Total: 1,897,551

The Região Metropolitana da Baixada Santista is a metropolitan area located on the coast of São Paulo state in Brazil, with a population of 1.7 million. Its most populous city is Santos.

As an administrative division (Região Metropolitana da Baixada Santista), it was created on 30 July 1996. It consists of nine municipalities.

The Baixada Santista is a major tourism region, especially for its numerous beaches. It also features the Port of Santos, the busiest container port in Latin America, and Cubatão, an industrial hub.

== List of municipalities ==
Administrative division	Population 2000 Census	Population (2010 Census)
Bertioga	30,039	47,572
Cubatão	108,309	118,797
Guarujá	264,812	290,607
Itanhaém	71,995	87,053
Mongaguá	35,098	46,310
Peruíbe	51,451	59,793
Praia Grande	193,582	260,769
Santos	417,983	419.757
São Vicente	303,551	332,424
Baixada Santista (Metropolitan Santos)	1,476,820	1,663,085
