= Itaquaquecetuba =

- Municipality
- Municipality of Itaquaquecetuba
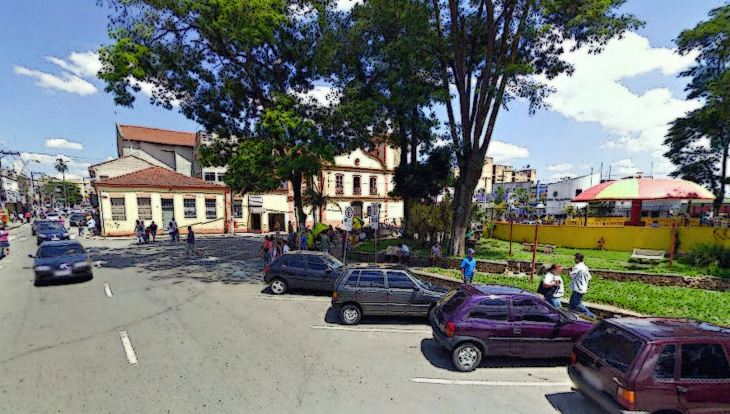
- The square Padre João Álvares, in the center of the municipality. In the background, the first church of Itaquaquecetuba can be seen.

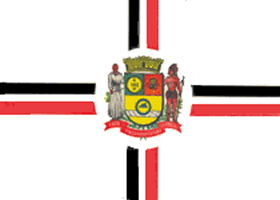
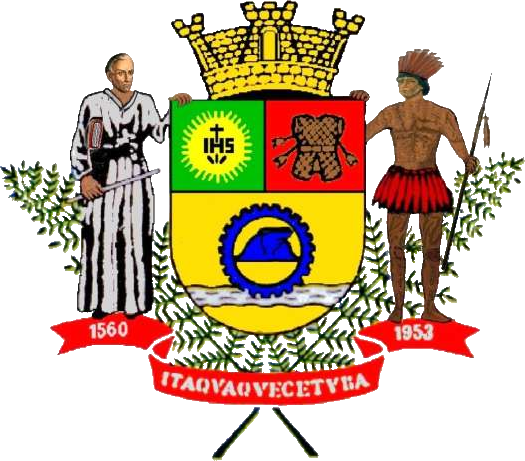
- Flag Coat of arms
- Nickname: Itaquá
- Location of Itaquaquecetuba

- Location within Brazil
- Coordinates: 23°29′11″S 46°20′55″W
- Country: Brazil
- Region: Southeast
- State: São Paulo

Government
  - Mayor: Eduardo Boigues Queroz (PP)

Area
  - Total: 82.62 km^{2} (31.90 sq mi)
- Elevation: 790 m (2,590 ft)

Population (2022)
  - Total: 369,275
  - Estimate (2025): 382,983
  - Density: 4,470/km^{2} (11,580/sq mi)
- Time zone: UTC-3 (UTC-3)
  - Summer (DST): UTC-2 (UTC-2)
- HDI (2010): 0.714 – high
- Website: www.itaquaquecetuba.sp.gov.br

Itaquaquecetuba, also simply called Itaquá, is a municipality in the state of São Paulo, Brazil. It is part of the Metropolitan Region of São Paulo. The population is 382,983 (2025 est.) in an area of 82.62 square kilometres (31.90 sq mi). It sits at an elevation of 790 metres (2,592 ft).

The municipality was founded between 1560 and 1563 by Jesuits led by Father Joseph of Anchieta, among native villages near the Tietê River, beginning with the Catholic chapel of Our Lady of Acute, which was established by Father Joseph. The settlement saw little development, and was almost deserted by the early twentieth century. Until 1958 the city was a district of Mogi das Cruzes. Following the emancipation of the municipality that year, the first Mayor, Victorio Eugenio Deliberato, began a campaign of industrial development that had great geographic and economic impact on Itaquaquecetuba in the decades to come.

Today, Itaquaquecetuba is one of the 10 best Brazilian cities who had significant advances in challenges against inequality in the last 20 years, and has the second-best GDP in the region.

It ranked 199th on the list of cities with the highest homicide rates per 100,000 inhabitants. Itaquaquecetuba has a strong industrial vocation due to its geographic location: highways such as SP-66, SP-56, SP-88 and the Ayrton Senna Highway pass through the city, connecting the city to cities such as Mogi das Cruzes, Poá, Suzano, Ferraz de Vasconcelos and Arujá. The city also borders other large urban centers, such as the state capital and Guarulhos.

== History ==
The origin of the city dates back to Itaquaquecetuba of the twelve villages founded by the Jesuit priest José de Anchieta, in his long stay in Brazil. Its creation is due to the then president of the province, Bernardo José Pinto Gavião Peixoto, named village of Nossa Senhora da Ajuda, on September 7, 1560, being established in the River Tietê, to catechize the guaianases.

== Law and Government ==
Itaquaquecetuba's City Hall is located at 267 Vereador José Fernandes da Silva Avenue.

== Etymology ==
The name is derived from its first form in Tupi takwakisé-tube, whose full meaning is "place of abundant bamboo sharp as knives".

== Transportation ==
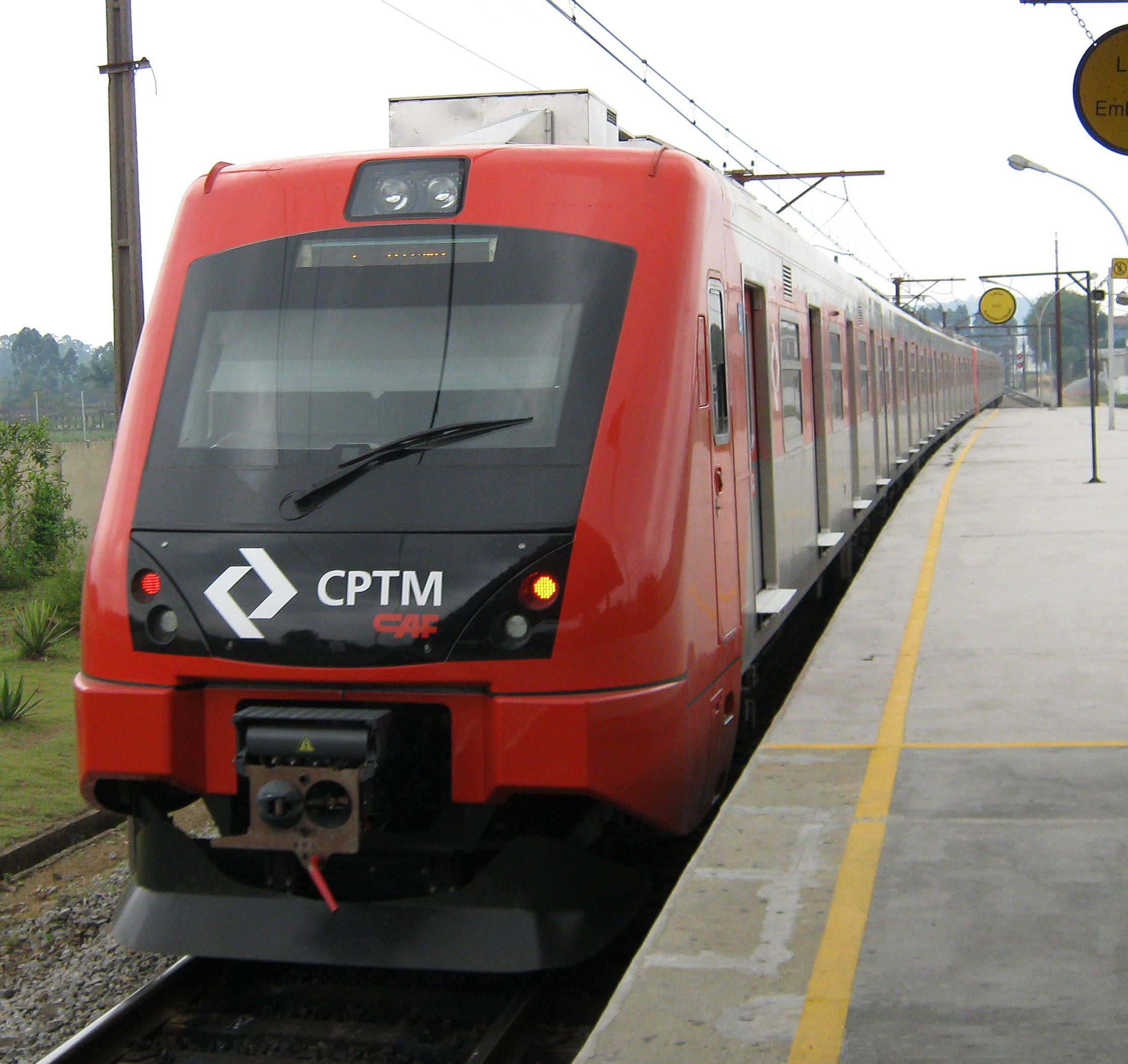
Train at Itaquaquecetuba Train Station.

=== Public transportation ===
The city is served by Line 12 of CPTM (Companhia Paulista de Trens Metropolitanos). The commuter rail system has 3 train stations: Engenheiro Manoel, Aracaré and Itaquaquecetuba. Local bus service is provided by Expresso Planalto and Intercity buses are also available connecting the city to Poá, Mogi das Cruzes, Guarulhos, Arujá, Santa Isabel, Ferraz de Vasconcelos, Suzano and São Paulo. Many bus companies operate such routes under permission of EMTU - Empresa Metropolitana de Transportes Urbanos de São Paulo, a state-owned company.

=== Roads ===
Itaquaquecetuba is crossed by four highways:

- SP-56 Alberto Hinoto Highway (Note: The stretch of SP-56 that passes through Itaquaquecetuba is named after Alberto "Bento" Hinoto (August 7, 1970 - March 2, 1996), guitarist and member of the iconic satirical rock band Mamonas Assassinas, who was born and raised in Itaquaquecetuba.)
- SP-66 João Afonso de Souza Castellano Highway
- SP-70 Ayrton Senna Highway
- SP-21 Mário Covas Beltway

== Geography ==
=== Climate ===
The climate of the city, and across the Metropolitan Region of São Paulo, is Subtropical. Summer is largely slightly hot and rainy.

== Education ==
=== Colleges and universities ===
- University of Guarulhos
- Technical School of Itaquaquecetuba - ETEC
- State Technological College of Itaquaquecetuba - FATEC
- Federal Institute of Education, Science and Technology of São Paulo - IFSP

== Media ==
In telecommunications, the city was served by Companhia Telefônica da Borda do Campo. In July 1998, this company was acquired by Telefónica, which adopted the Vivo brand in 2012. The company is currently an operator of cell phones, fixed lines, internet (fiber optics/4G) and television (satellite and cable).

== Notable people ==
- Cafu, former Football player
- Bento Hinoto, Mamonas Assassinas's guitarist

== See also ==
- List of municipalities in São Paulo
