= Presidency of Washington Luís =

Government of Brazil (1926–1930)

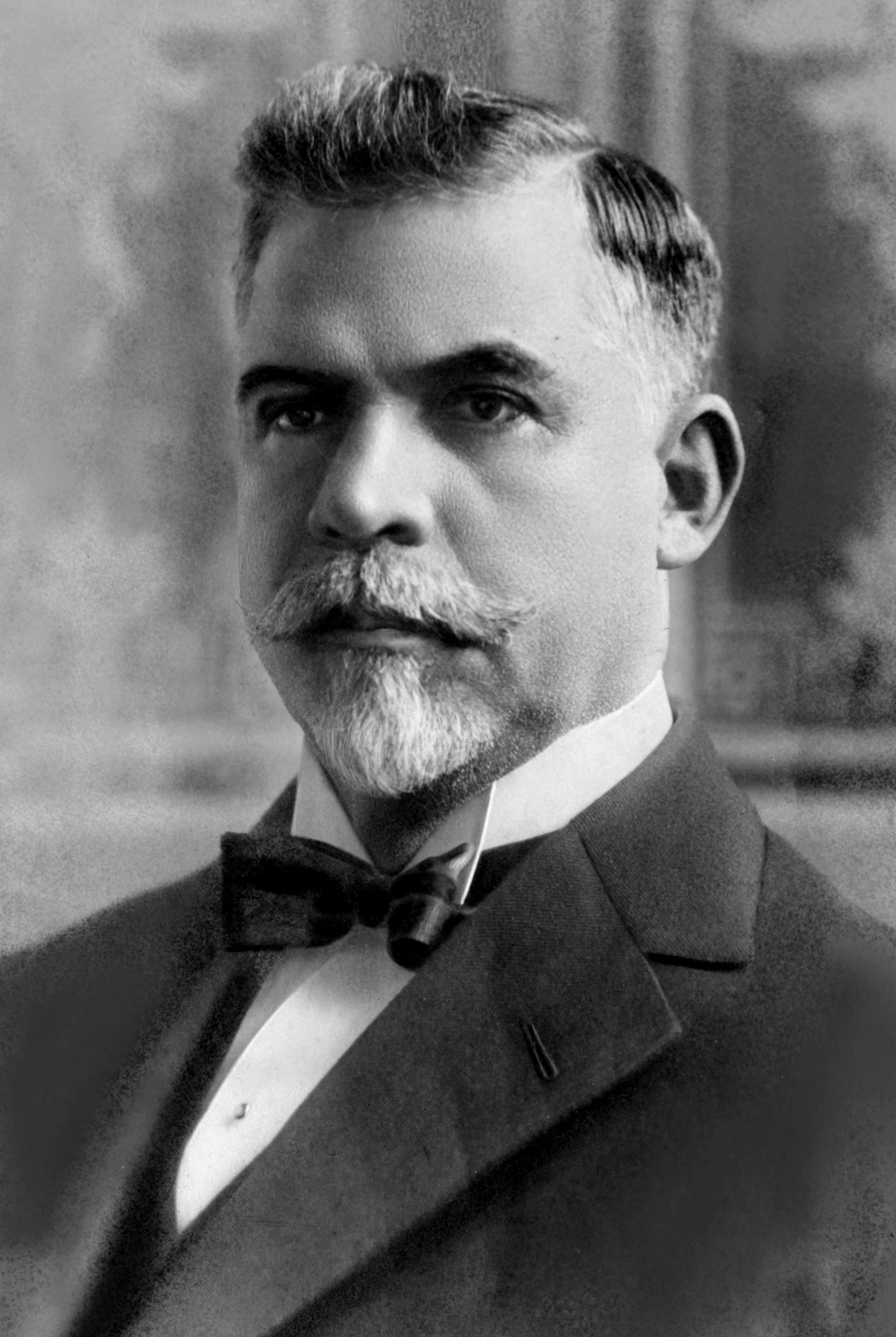
- Official portrait, 1926
- Presidency of Washington Luís; 15 November 1926 – 24 October 1930
- Vice President: Melo Viana
- Party: PRP
- Election: 1926
- Seat: Catete Palace
- Standard of the President

Washington Luís' tenure as the 13th president of Brazil on 15 November 1926, after he won the 1926 presidential election, and ended on 24 October 1930, when he was deposed by the military during the Revolution of 1930. Following the troubled presidency of Artur Bernardes, Washington Luís still had to deal with the tenentist movement, with the end of the Prestes Column, which had lasted since 1925, being a significant development.

His presidency was marked by the creation of the first Infant Code in the country, the creation of the current Federal Highway Police, the construction of the first highway that connected Rio de Janeiro to São Paulo, and also the first paved highway in Brazil, as highway transport played a fundamental role in his government, and the creation of a fund for highway construction. As he had done as mayor of São Paulo and later president (governor) of the homonymous state, Washington Luís published old documents from the Brazil's National Archives, thus preserving many texts from the country's history, which were at risk of being destroyed by insects. During his term, Brazil's GDP grew at an average of 5.1% per year.

Washington Luís' appointment of Júlio Prestes, then president of São Paulo, as his successor, broke with the milk coffee policy and contributed to the outbreak of the Revolution of 1930, which resulted in the end of the First Brazilian Republic and the beginning of the Vargas Era.

== Background ==
=== Presidential election of 1926 ===
Then governor of São Paulo, Washington Luís was the candidate chosen in accordance with the milk coffee policy, but the governor of Minas Gerais, Melo Viana, thought it was better for another Minas Gerais politician to succeed Artur Bernardes, and started a campaign. Minister Afonso Pena Júnior of the Bernardes government convinced Melo Viana to run for the position of vice president; and so the Washington Luís-Melo Viana ticket won the election without opposition. Washington Luís' main competitor in the 1926 election was the liberal politician from Rio Grande do Sul Joaquim de Assis Brasil.

== Domestic policy ==
=== Beginning ===
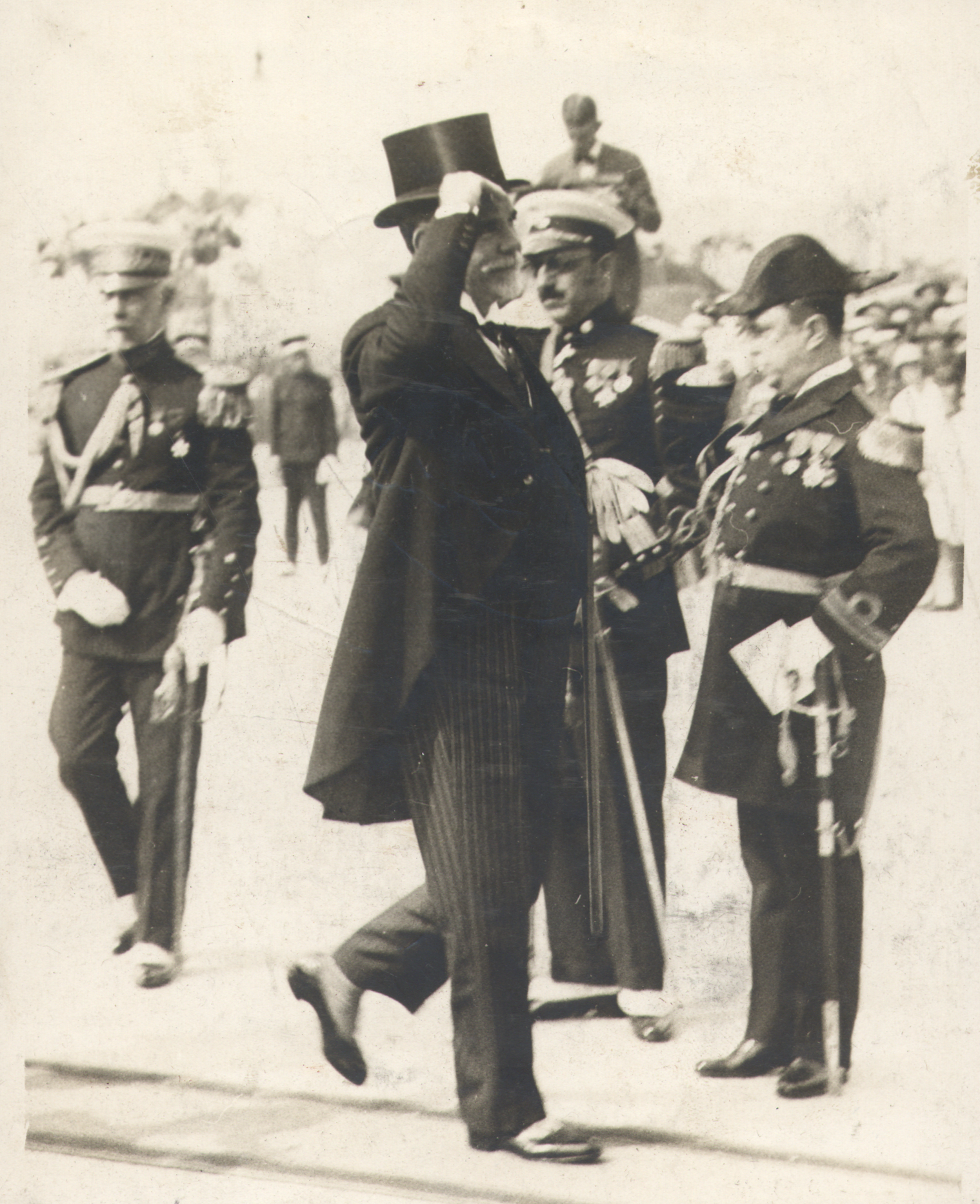
Washington Luis arriving to watch a troop parade

Washington Luís assumed the presidency of Brazil on 15 November 1926. His election was received with great hopes after a period of deep political unrest. The state of emergency, approved in the previous four years by president Artur Bernardes, was not renewed, although it continued to be in force in some states to fight the Prestes Column. Washington Luís abolished the political prisons on Trindade and Clevelândia in Amapá, however, despite having promised to release all political prisoners, according to his presidential message of 1927, Luís did not grant amnesty to the rebels of 1922, 1923, 1924 and 1925, although he granted freedom to military and civilian prisoners.

=== Defence ===
Washington Luís created the National Defence Council in 1927, which would consist of the president and state ministers, with the task of "coordinating the production of intel on financial, economic, military and moral issues relating to the defence of the Fatherland". This council was the embryo of Brazil's intelligence and national security bodies. In 1927, Washington Luís officially created Army Aviation as the Brazilian Army's "fifth branch".

=== Economy ===
==== Decree No. 5,108 ====
On 18 December 1926, Washington Luís instituted economic, financial, monetary and exchange rate reforms in Brazil through decree No. 5,108, adopting the gold standard and a new currency, the Cruzeiro; his finance minister at that time was Getúlio Vargas. The most prominent point that was effectively put into practice was the Stabilization Bank, the new body's exclusive responsibility was to receive gold, in bars or coins, national and foreign, and in exchange issuing notes of the same value to the depositors. The adoption of the new currency was postponed thanks to the Great Depression and the Revolution of 1930, the currency exchange would only take place in 1942, with the adoption of the first Cruzeiro.

==== Great Depression ====
From 1925 onwards, the difference between coffee production and demand became very worrying, and in 1926 Brazil's Coffee Institute even started to increase the prices of the product on the international market by increasing the retention of the product. This strategy was unsuccessful — and was further aggravated by the onset of the Great Depression in 1929. With this crisis, the United States and Europe greatly reduced coffee purchases, severely damaging exports of the product.

=== Legislation ===
As a consequence of the public outcry that occurred after the Waldemiro Boy Case, the sexual abuse of a 12-year-old boy in a prison, Washington Luís instituted, through decree No. 5,083 of 1 December 1926, the first Infant Code in the country, which established the age of criminal responsibility for the first time in Brazil.

In August 1927, after new outbreaks of political turmoil, leading to the strengthening of the opposition, including the creation of the Democratic Party (PD) that emerged in the main state that supported the government, São Paulo, Washington Luís tightened the Press Law and approved the so-called Celerada Law, which restricted civil and press freedom and made the Communist Party illegal again. In 1928, Washington Luís created the Road Police, which was renamed Federal Highway Police in 1945, a name it retains to this day.

=== Infrastructure ===
Through Decree No. 5,141 of 5 January 1927, the Special Fund for the Construction and Conservation of Federal Highways was created in order to finance road development in Brazil. One of Washington Luís achievements was the Rio-Petrópolis highway which, opened in 1928, would later receive his name, belonging to BR-040, the first paved highway in Brazil and considered a landmark of Brazilian civil engineering, although many people at the time thought that the works were carried out by Americans or other foreigners.

The São Paulo-Rio Highway (which still exists in some sections called SP-62, SP-64, SP-66 and SP-68, in the state of São Paulo) was completed, started still during his term as governor of São Paulo, inaugurating it on 5 May 1928. A very difficult work to carry out. It was the first highway to connect São Paulo to Rio de Janeiro and the only connection between São Paulo and Rio de Janeiro until the inauguration of the Via Dutra Highway in 1950. After its completion, an automobile journey between São Paulo and Rio de Janeiro lasted 14 hours, compared to 36 days in 1908, when Count Lesdain made the first trip between São Paulo and Rio de Janeiro in a Brasier 16 HP.

== Foreign policy ==
Under the command of Otávio Mangabeira, Brazil's Ministry of Foreign Affairs underwent a restructuring, giving greater administrative attention with the creation of Economic and Commercial Services; the organization of the archive, the library and the establishment of better facilities; integration with the Ministry of Finance and the Ministry of Agriculture, Industry and Commerce, with foreign trade, external credit and immigration as its central focus; and the centralization and improvement in the production of information, through the production of monthly reports by the diplomatic corps. Brazil's non-adherence to the Kellogg–Briand Pact was also highlighted, a fact that only occurred in July 1934, through Decree No. 24,557 of 3 July 1934.

In 1928, Brazil received a visit from Herbert Hoover, the president-elect of the United States.

== Succession crisis ==
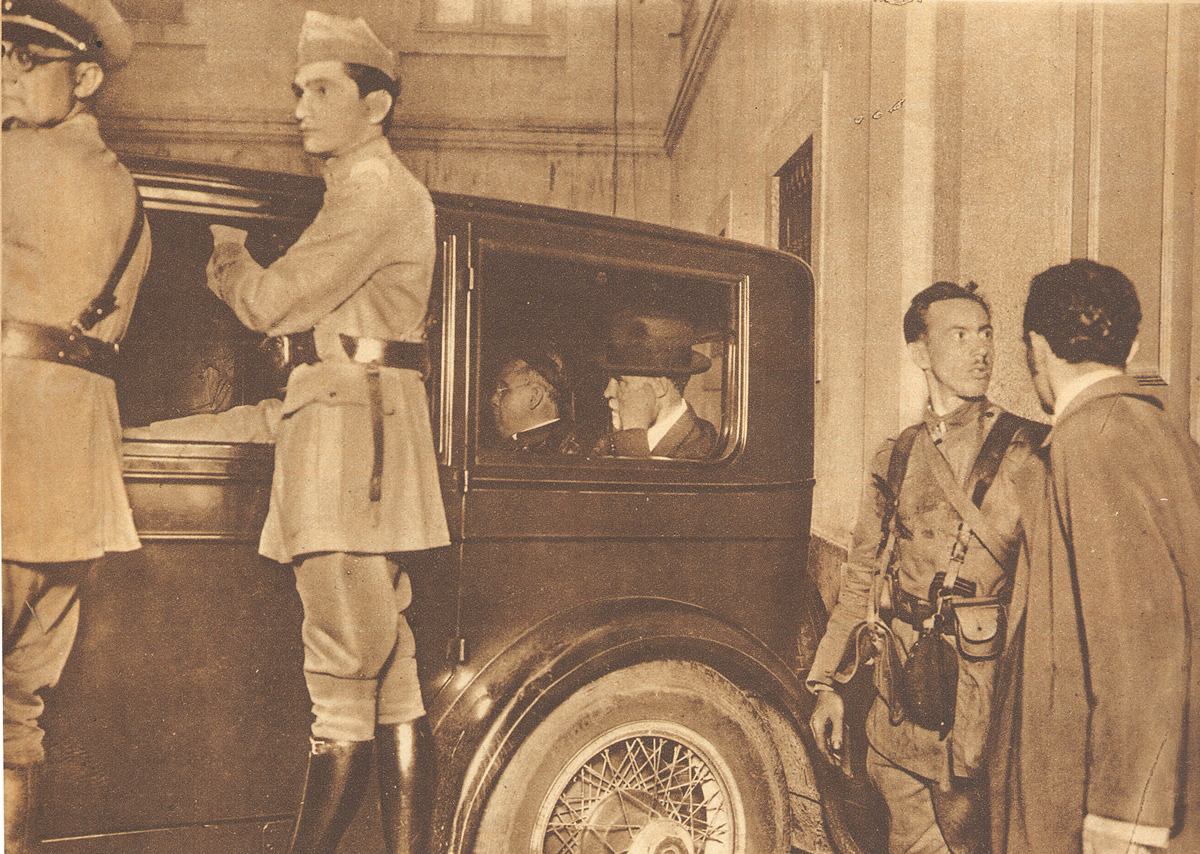
Washington Luís, accompanied by Archbishop Sebastião Leme, leaving the Guanabara Palace

In 1929, Washington Luís supported Júlio Prestes, then president of the state of São Paulo, as his successor for the upcoming 1930 presidential election, and the president of Bahia, Vital Soares, for vice president. By doing so, Luís broke with the milk coffee policy and obtained the support of seventeen state presidents, with only the presidents of Minas Gerais, Rio Grande do Sul and Paraíba being against the nomination of Júlio Prestes. The presidents of these three states and opposition politicians from several states then came together to form the Liberal Alliance and launch Getúlio Vargas for president and João Pessoa for vice-president.

On 1 March 1930, Júlio Prestes won the election amid protests from the opposition, who denounced the occurrence of fraud. Rumors arose about a possible revolution, which were denied by Vargas and other Liberal Alliance leaders. After the murder of João Pessoa for unrelated reasons, members of the Alliance launched a revolution on 3 October 1930.

On 24 October 1930, with the revolution raging, the military ministers (Army and Navy) went ahead and deposed Washington Luís, who was arrested, left the Guanabara Palace accompanied by the Cardinal-Archbishop of Rio de Janeiro Sebastião Leme, and was taken to Fort Copacabana. The military ministers formed a junta and assumed the presidency, but later handed it over to Getúlio Vargas on 3 November 1930, thus ending the First Brazilian Republic.
