= Rodovia Ayrton Senna =

Highway in São Paulo

SP-070 Rodovia Ayrton Senna
- Via Leste (until 1982); Rodovia dos Trabalhadores (until 1994)
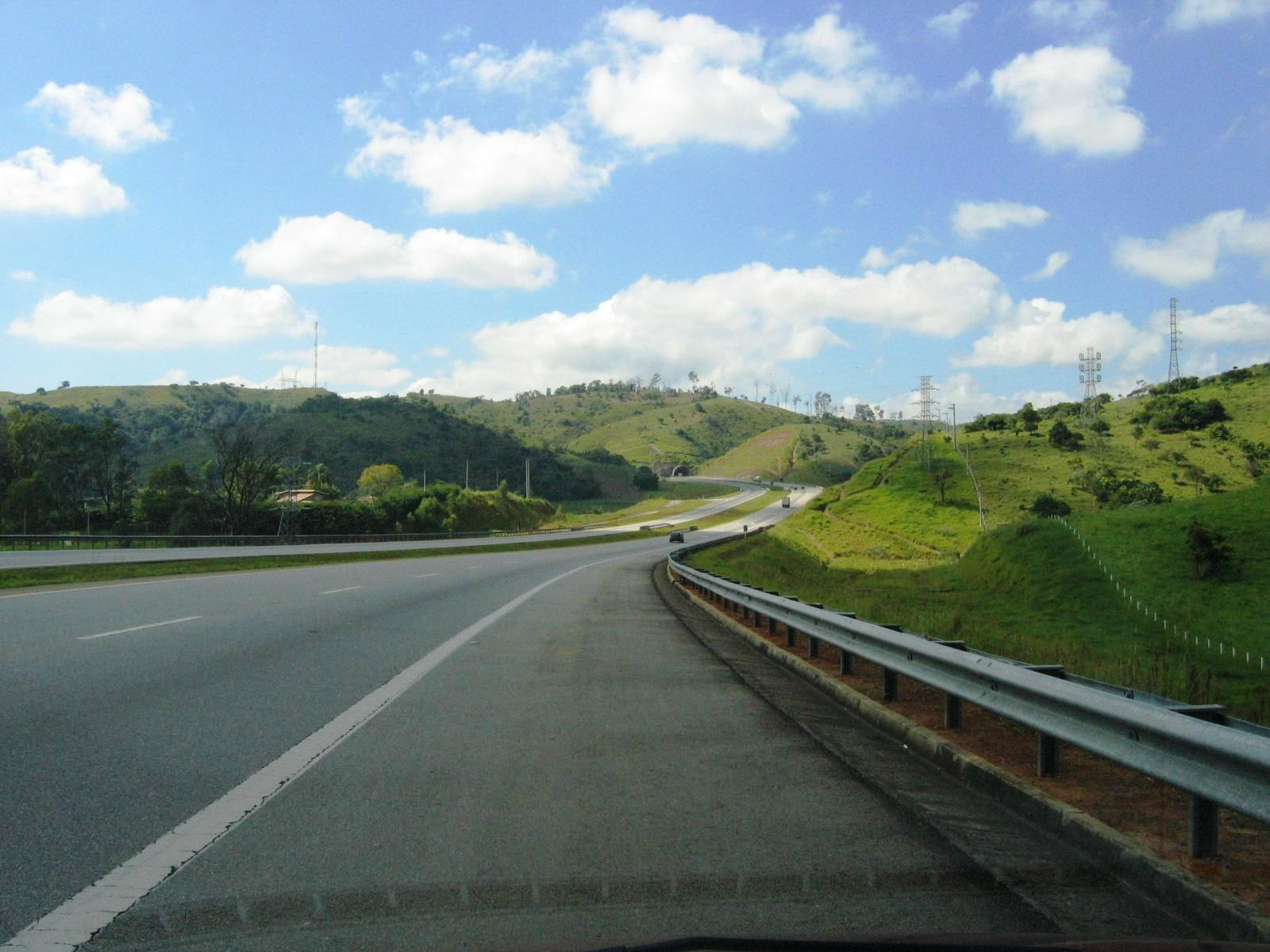
- Rodovia Ayrton Senna da Silva

Route information
- Maintained by Ecopistas
- Length: 48.3 km (30.0 mi)
- Existed: 1982–present

Major junctions
- West end: Marginal Tietê in São Paulo, SP
- SP-019; SP-017; Rodoanel; SP-088; BR-116 (Dutra)
- East end: Rodovia Carvalho Pinto in Guararema, SP

Location
- Country: Brazil
- State: São Paulo

Highway system
- Highways in Brazil; Federal; São Paulo State Highways

Rodovia Ayrton Senna da Silva (officially designated SP-070 and formerly named Rodovia dos Trabalhadores) (Workers' Highway), is a highway in the state of São Paulo, Brazil.

The highway begins in the Eastern region of city of São Paulo and ends at the county of Guararema, merging with Rodovia Presidente Dutra.

The cities served by Rodovia Ayrton Senna are Guarulhos, Itaquaquecetuba, Mogi das Cruzes, Suzano, Poá and Guararema. It continues in the same direction into Rodovia Carvalho Pinto, which has the same SP-070 designation, in parallel with Dutra Highway.

Near São Paulo, special highway engineering techniques had to be used, in order to cross the natural swamp area by the Tietê River without damaging the nearby ecosystem. Its main traffic nowadays is between São Paulo and the São Paulo/Guarulhos International Airport (also known as Cumbica Airport).

The highway is named in honour of the deceased Brazilian Formula One triple World Champion, Ayrton Senna.

It was managed and maintained by DERSA, a state-owned company, until June 18, 2009. It is now maintained by Ecopistas, but it is a toll road.

== Story ==
On August 3, 1979, Decree No. 13,756, gave concession to DERSA for construction and exploration of the Eastern Road, now called the Ayrton Senna Highway.

The highway, former Trabalhadores, had the first stretch of São Paulo-Guararema built by DERSA in 22 months - from June 1980 to April 30, 1982 -, has a length of 48.3 km, to which were added 5, corresponding to the interconnection with the Presidente Dutra Highway in which it has the name of Access SP 070 / BR-116.

The inauguration took place on May 1, 1982. The work met a historical need, determined by the growth of the São Paulo Metropolitan Region with access to the Tietê Ecological Park, São Paulo / Guarulhos International Airport and Intermodal Cargo Terminal.

In addition to alleviating the traffic that congested the Presidente Dutra Highway in the busiest section (São Paulo-Guarulhos), the Highway became the long-needed alternative between the city of São Paulo and the Vale do Paraíba and Rio de Janeiro. It also began to facilitate tourism to the North Coast and Campos do Jordão.

Since June 18, 2009, the concessionaire Ecopistas, of the EcoRodovias Group, is responsible for the management and administration of the highways that make up the Ayrton Senna / Carvalho Pinto Corridor: the SP-70, which links the city of São Paulo and Valley of the Paraíba, with 140 km of extension.

== See also ==
- Highway system of São Paulo
- Brazilian Highway System
