= SP-56 (São Paulo highway) =

State highway in São Paulo, Brazil

SP-056

Route information
- Length: 47.550 km (29.546 mi)

Location
- Country: Brazil
- State: São Paulo

Highway system
- Highways in Brazil; Federal; São Paulo State Highways

SP-56 is a highway in the eastern and the southeastern parts of the state of São Paulo in Brazil. The highway runs from the SP-66 at Itaquauqecetuba up to Santa Isabel.

The highway is split into four sections:

- Alberto Hinoto, Doutor: from SP-66 (Itaquaquecetuba) to Arujá
- Albino Rodrigues Neves, Vereador: from Arujá to Santa Isabel
- Joaquim Simão, Former Mayor: from Igaratá to Santa Isabel
