= Rodovia Presidente Dutra =

Highway in Brazil

BR-116
- Rodovia Presidente Dutra
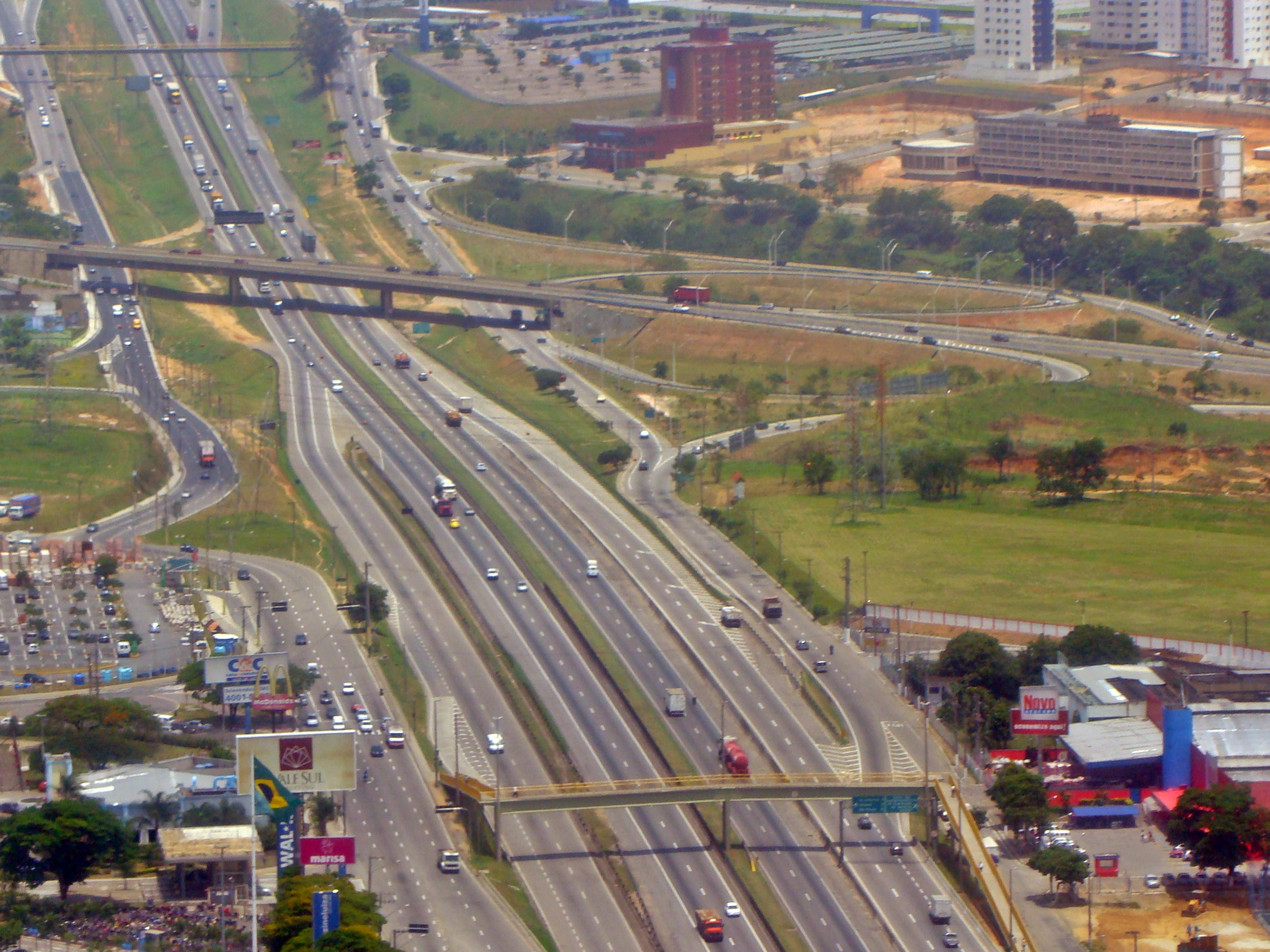
- Rodovia Presidente Dutra in São José dos Campos, SP

Route information
- Maintained by CCR RioSP and EcoRioMinas (since 2022)
- Length: 402 km (250 mi)
- Existed: 1951 (duplication made to a Dual carriageway in 1967)–present

Major junctions
- East end: Avenida Brasil in Vista Alegre, Rio de Janeiro, RJ
- RJ-071 Red Line; RJ-085 Automóvel Clube Ab.; RJ-105 (access to Nova Iguaçu and Belford Roxo); RJ-093 (access to Engenheiro Pedreira, district of Japeri); RJ-125 (access to Japeri, Miguel Pereira and Paty do Alferes); BR-493 Arco Metropolitano do Rio de Janeiro; RJ-127 (access to Paracambi and Eng. Paulo de Frontin); BR-465 former Rodovia Rio-São Paulo; RJ-145 (access to Piraí, Barra do Piraí and Valença); BR-393 Lúcio Meira; RJ-155 (access to Angra dos Reis); BR-354 Resende-Caxambu; SP-068 Rodovia dos Tropeiros; BR-459 Lorena-Poços de Caldas; SP-171 former Estrada Real (access to Paraty); SP-125 Oswaldo Cruz (access to Ubatuba); SP-070 Carvalho Pinto; SP-123 Floriano R. Pinheiro (access to Campos do Jordão); SP-050 Rodovia Monteiro Lobato; SP-099 Rodovia dos Tamoios (access to Caraguatatuba); SP-065 D. Pedro I (access to Campinas); SP-070 Ayrton Senna; SP-088 Mogi-Dutra; SP-021 Rodoanel Mário Covas; SP-019 Hélio Smidt; BR-381 Fernão Dias
- West end: Marginal Tietê in Vila Maria, São Paulo, SP

Location
- Country: Brazil
- States: São Paulo, Rio de Janeiro

Highway system
- Highways in Brazil; Federal

The Rodovia Presidente Dutra, (BR-116 – or SP-060 in the state of São Paulo), colloquially known as Via Dutra is a federal highway which runs through the eastern part of the state of São Paulo and southwestern region of the state of Rio de Janeiro. It is the part of the route BR-116 connecting the city of São Paulo to the city of Rio de Janeiro.

It covers a total distance of 402 kilometres (250 mi), starting at the Trevo das Margaridas in Rio de Janeiro and ending at the junction with Marginal Tietê in São Paulo. It merges with Rodovia Ayrton Senna in the county of Guararema and has junctions with the Rodovia Fernão Dias, the BR-354 and the BR-459. The highway largely follows the Paraíba do Sul river valley.

The Via Dutra is considered the most important Brazilian highway since it connects the two biggest and most important cities of Brazil and runs through one of the richest regions of the country, the Paraíba Valley. It is also the most important connection between the Southern Region and the Northeast Region. It is named after former Brazilian president Eurico Gaspar Dutra, who inaugurated the highway.

The highway was managed by CCR NovaDutra in 1996 until March 2022, when CCR RioSP took over management.

== History ==
The first road between the city of São Paulo and the city of Rio de Janeiro was built by the Washington Luis government and inaugurated on Saturday, 5 May 1928.

At the end of the 1940s industrialization and the necessity of a faster, safer and more efficient and modern road connection of the two biggest Brazilian cities led to the construction of the Rodovia Presidente Dutra as it is known today. It was inaugurated on Friday, 19 January 1951, by the President Eurico Gaspar Dutra and called BR-2. It was a two-lane road with exception of the stretches between São Paulo and Guarulhos and in the Baixada Fluminense where it was a four-lane dual carriageway.

In the 1960s it had various stretches converted to four-lane divided road. In 1967 it was fully converted to four-lane highway status.

In the 1970s traffic has been eased on the Via Dutra due to the construction of the Rodovia dos Trabalhadores, now called Rodovia Ayrton Senna and its part built in the 1990s called Rodovia Governador Carvalho Pinto leading up to Taubaté.

The highway is managed and maintained by a state concession to the private company NovaDutra S/A since March 1996, and therefore is a toll road. From that transfer of ownership up to today it has largely improved in road quality and safety.

== Main municipalities crossed by the highway ==
=== Rio de Janeiro (RJ) ===
- Rio de Janeiro
- São João de Meriti
- Belford Roxo
- Nova Iguaçu
- Queimados
- Seropédica
- Itaguaí
- Paracambi
- Piraí
- Pinheiral
- Volta Redonda
- Barra Mansa
- Porto Real
- Itatiaia
- Resende

=== São Paulo (SP) ===
- Queluz
- Lavrinhas
- Cruzeiro
- Cachoeira Paulista
- Canas
- Lorena
- Guaratinguetá
- Aparecida
- Roseira
- Pindamonhangaba
- Taubaté
- Caçapava
- São José dos Campos
- Guararema
- Jacareí
- Santa Isabel
- Arujá
- Guarulhos
- São Paulo

== See also ==
- Highway system of São Paulo
- Brazilian Highway System
