= Rodovia Carvalho Pinto =

Highway in São Paulo, Brazil

SP-070 Rodovia Carvalho Pinto

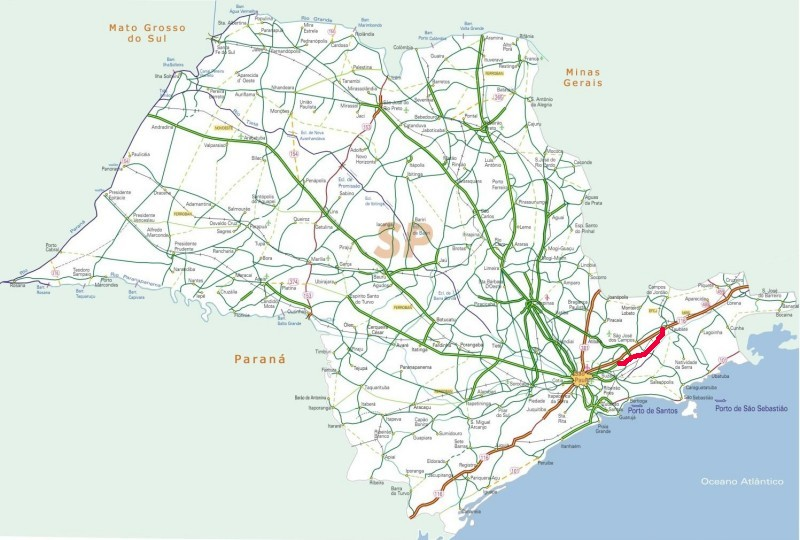
- Map of the itinerary of Rodovia Carvalho Pinto (in red)

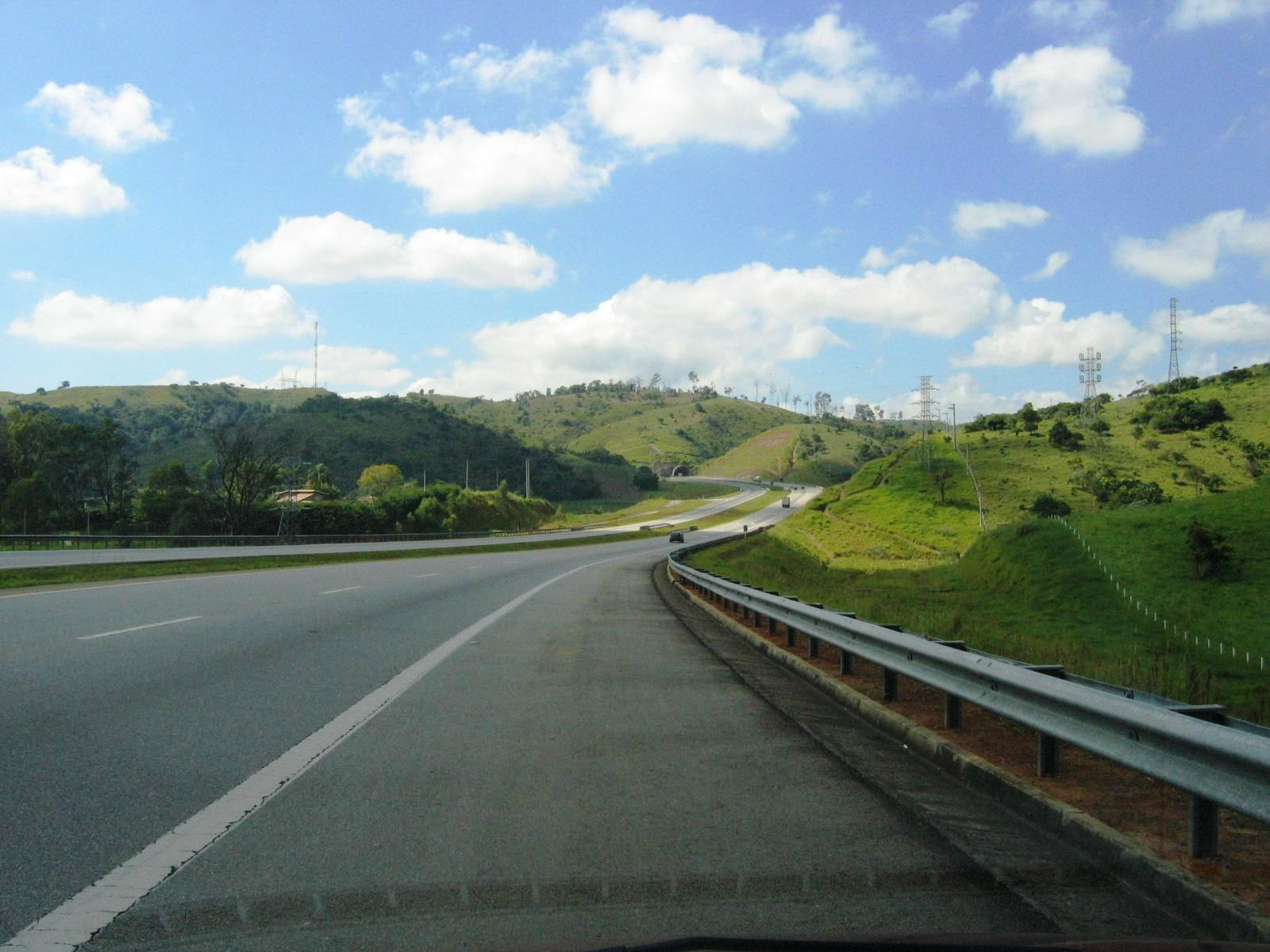
- Rodovia Governador Carvalho Pinto, near Jacareí

Route information
- Maintained by Ecopistas
- Length: 70.15 km (43.59 mi)
- Existed: 1994 (expanded in 1998)–present

Major junctions
- West end: Rodovia Ayrton Senna in Guararema, SP
- SP-99 (Tamoios); SP-65 (D. Pedro I); SP-66 (Rodovia Henrique Eroles); SP-77 (Rodovia Nilo Máximo); SP-103 (Rodovia João do Amaral Gurgel); BR-116 (Dutra); SP-123 (Rodovia Floriano Rodrigues Pinheiro)
- East end: Rodovia Oswaldo Cruz in Taubaté, SP

Location
- Country: Brazil
- State: São Paulo

Highway system
- Highways in Brazil; Federal; São Paulo State Highways

The Rodovia Governador Carvalho Pinto (officially designated SP-070) is a highway in the state of São Paulo, Brazil.

It is a continuation of the Rodovia Ayrton Senna (also SP-070), near the city of Guararema and ends by merging with Rodovia Presidente Dutra, which connects the cities of São Paulo and Rio de Janeiro; and Rodovia Floriano Rodrigues Pinheiro (SP-123), which connects Taubaté to Campos do Jordão. In 2018, a branch was added linking it to Rodovia Oswaldo Cruz, which connects Taubaté to Ubatuba The cities served by the highway are Guararema, Jacareí, São José dos Campos, Caçapava and Taubaté.

The highway was built in order to relieve the traffic saturation of the Presidente Dutra Highway, and is the main thoroughfare used by the paulistas who wish to travel to the beaches and cities near the South Atlantic Ocean of the Northern coast of the state (Rodovia dos Tamoios, SP-099), as well as to other cities of the Paraíba River valley, such as Paraibuna and Jambeiro on the plateau of Serra do Mar, and to the mountain resorts in the Mantiqueira Mountains, such as Santo Antonio do Pinhal and Campos do Jordão, via the Rodovia Floriano Rodrigues Pinheiro.

The highway honours one of the former governors of the state of São Paulo, Carlos Alberto Alves de Carvalho Pinto.

It was managed and maintained by DERSA, a state-owned company, until 18 June 2009. Now it's maintained by Ecopistas, but is a toll road.

== See also ==
- Highway system of São Paulo
- Brazilian Highway System
