= SP-70 (São Paulo highway) =

State highway in São Paulo, Brazil

SP-070 SP-70 (São Paulo highway)

Route information
- Length: 123.510 km (76.746 mi)

Location
- Country: Brazil
- State: São Paulo

Highway system
- Highways in Brazil; Federal; São Paulo State Highways

The SP-70 is a highway in the southeastern part of the state of São Paulo in Brazil. A part of the highway from the city of São Paulo to the BR-116 (Rodovia Presidente Dutra) is called the Rodovia Ayrton Senna which is named after Ayrton Senna (also called Trabalhadores). Another part of the highway from Guararema to Taubaté is called the Rodovia Carvalho Pinto which is named after a former governor of the state, José Alberto Carvalho Pinto .
