= Suzano =

Municipality in São Paulo, Brazil

- Municipality
- Município de Suzano; Municipality of Suzano
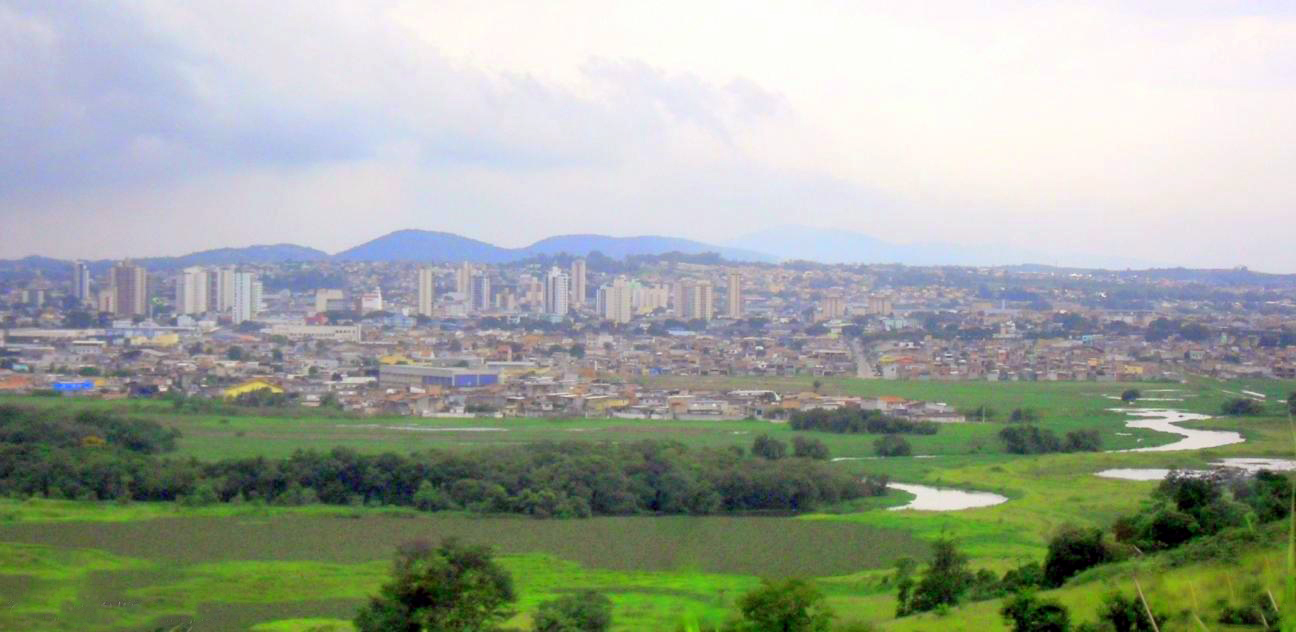
- Downtown Suzano

- Flag Coat of arms
- Nickname: Cidade das Flores (City of Flowers)
- Location in São Paulo state

- Location within Brazil Location within South America
- Coordinates: 23°32′34″S 46°18′39″W
- Country: Brazil
- Region: Southeast
- State: São Paulo
- Metropolitan Region: São Paulo
- Founded: April 2, 1949

Government
  - Mayor: Rodrigo Ashiuchi (PR)

Area
  - Total: 206.24 km^{2} (79.63 sq mi)
- Elevation: 749 m (2,457 ft)

Population (2022)
  - Total: 307,429
  - Estimate (2025): 320,261
  - Density: 1,490.6/km^{2} (3,860.7/sq mi)
- Time zone: UTC-3 (BRT)
  - Summer (DST): UTC-2 (BRST)
- HDI (2010): 0.765 – high
- Website: Suzano, São Paulo

Suzano is a municipality in São Paulo state, Brazil. It is part of the Metropolitan Region of São Paulo. The population is 300,559 (2020 est.) in an area of 206.24 km^{2} (79.63 sq mi). The elevation is 749 m.

Suzano's industrial growth was boosted in the past by the availability of available sites for companies to set up and by its access to highways that lead to the interior and coast of the state. The Índio Tibiriçá, Rodoanel and Henrique Eroles highways pass directly through Suzano. Suzano has direct access to the Ayrton Senna Highway, the Anchieta Highway and indirect access to Mogi-Dutra and consequently to Dutra itself.

== History ==
The municipality was created by state law in 1948.

Suzano has a large Japanese Brazilian population. It consists of a large downtown area surrounded by residential areas. There are three main roads that travel through the downtown section. One of them is a one-way street (northbound), and two are one-way streets (southbound). It was named after the engineer who built the train station.

The city features a medium-sized shopping mall, city hall, train station, frequent bus routes, and a small number of office and residential buildings. Suzano is an important industrial center today, although it was originally agricultural.

Many soldiers who fought in Italy's Monte Castello in World War II were from Suzano.

On March 13, 2019, there was a school shooting at the Raul Brasil School in Suzano. Eight people were killed before the two gunmen died of suicide.

== Transportation ==
=== Railroads ===
Suzano has one train station that is part of CPTM line 11.

=== Roads ===
Suzano is crossed by five highways:

- SP-31 Índio Tibiriçá Highway
- SP-66 João Afonso Highway
- SP-70 Ayrton Senna Highway
- SP-88 Rodovia Mogi-Dutra Highway
- SP-21 Rodoanel Leste Gov. Mario Covas Highway

== Media ==
In telecommunications, the city was served by Companhia Telefônica da Borda do Campo. In July 1998, this company was acquired by Telefónica, which adopted the Vivo brand in 2012. The company is currently an operator of cell phones, fixed lines, internet (fiber optics/4G) and television (satellite and cable).

== Sister cities ==
- Komatsu, Ishikawa, Japan
- Lauderhill, Florida, United States
- Yuyao, Zhejiang, China

== Notable people ==
- Suellen Cristine Delangelica Lima (born 1989), teacher and sitting volleyball player
- Thiaguinho (footballer, born 1997)
- Léo (footballer, born 1990)
- Marcelinho (footballer, born 1994)
- Juliana Terao (born 1991), chess player.
- Mike (footballer, born 1993)
- Janaína Cunha (born 1977), sitting volleyball player.
- Felipe França (born 1987), breaststroke swimmer
- Leandro Guilheiro (born 1993), male judoka.
- Vitória Yaya (born 2002), professional footballer.
- Débora Nascimento (born 1984), famous actress
- Douglas Belchior (born 1978), Brazilian activist.

== See also ==
- Suzano Papel e Celulose
- Suzano school shooting
- List of municipalities in São Paulo
