= SP-15 (São Paulo highway) =

State highway in São Paulo, Brazil

SP-015

Route information
- Length: 40.489 km (25.159 mi)

Location
- Country: Brazil
- State: São Paulo

Highway system
- Highways in Brazil; Federal; São Paulo State Highways

SP-15 is a state highway in the state of São Paulo in Brazil. Part of it consists of the Marginal Tietê and the other part is the Marginal Pinheiros.
