= Marginal Tietê =

Highway in São Paulo

Marginal Tietê
- Via Professor Simão Faiguenboim (official name)
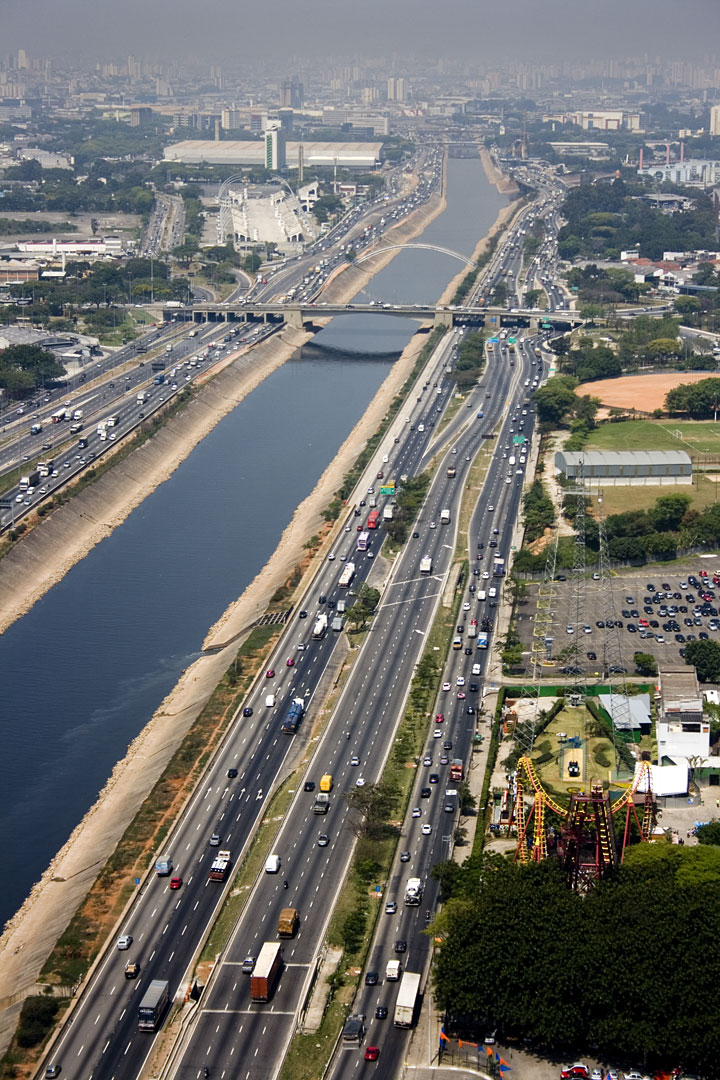
- Marginal Tietê.

Route information
- Maintained by CCR (West Segment), Prefeitura de São Paulo and Ecopistas (East Segment)
- Length: 24.5 km (15.2 mi)
- Existed: 1957 (expanded in 2010)–present

Major junctions
- West end: Marginal Pinheiros in São Paulo, SP
- C. Branco; Anhangüera; Bandeirantes; Dutra; Fernão Dias; Ayrton Senna
- East end: Rodovia Ayrton Senna in São Paulo, SP

Location
- Country: Brazil
- State: São Paulo

Highway system
- Highways in Brazil; Federal

Marginal Tietê (officially SP-015) is a section of this highway that runs through the city of São Paulo, Brazil. The name of this section comes from the fact that each way of the expressway runs near a different waterfront of the Tietê River.

It is a major road of São Paulo, connecting the East, North and West portions of the city, and linking the Lapa and the Penha neighbourhoods. It provides access to the Castelo Branco highway, the Bandeirantes highway, the Anhangüera highway, the Presidente Dutra highway, the Fernão Dias highway, the Ayrton Senna highway and the São Paulo International Airport. The Campo de Marte Airport, the Estádio Parque São Jorge and the Estádio do Canindé are located near the freeway.

== History ==
The first plans to build on the waterfront of Tietê River were devised in 1924 by engineer Saturnino de Brito, president of the Comissão de Melhoramentos do Rio Tietê; his project included the channeling of the river, straightening its watercourse, the building of boulevards in its margins , destining 30% of the floodplain areas to parks and two artificial lakes serving as retention basins.

Brito's original plans were modified by mayor Prestes Maia, who favored a plan of building expressways on the river margins. Construction of the Marginais Tietê and Pinheiros began in 1950; its first section was opened in 1957. The last one, between Aricanduva and Guarulhos, was completed in 1977.

== Sports events ==
A section of Marginal Tietê was part of IRL São Paulo Indy 300, held between 2010 and 2013.
