= Rodovia dos Tamoios =

Highway in São Paulo

SP-099 Rodovia dos Tamoios

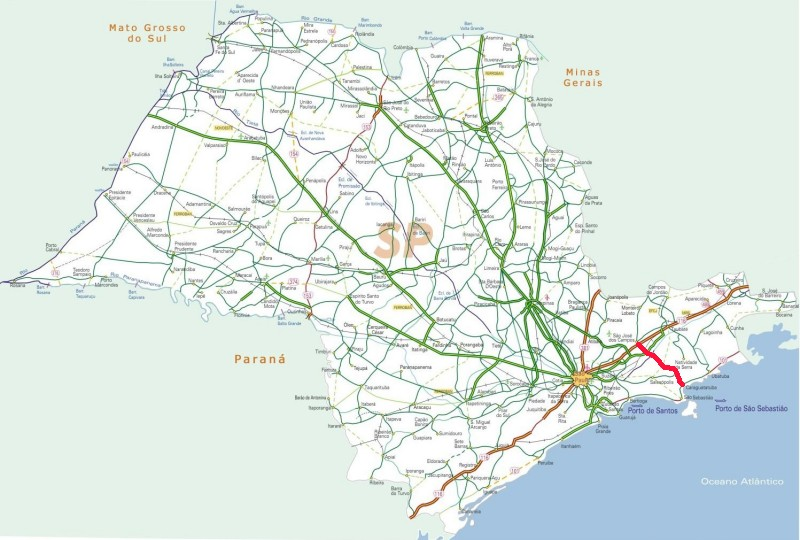
- Itinerary map of the Rodovia dos Tamoios (in red)

Route information
- Maintained by Ecopistas and Concessionária Tamoios
- Length: 82 km (51 mi)
- Existed: 1957–present

Major junctions
- North end: Av. Mário Covas in São José dos Campos, SP
- Rodovia Governador Carvalho Pinto; SP-88 - Rodovia Alfredo Rolim de Moura; SP-55 - Rodovia Doutor Manuel Hipólito Rego
- South end: Av. Pres. Campos Salles in Caraguatatuba, SP

Location
- Country: Brazil
- State: São Paulo

Highway system
- Highways in Brazil; Federal; São Paulo State Highways

The Rodovia dos Tamoios (official designation SP-099) is a highway in the Brazilian state of São Paulo.

The Rodovia dos Tamoios is a dual carriageway running from the city of São José dos Campos, located in the Paraíba River valley in the upper plateau of São Paulo down the Serra do Mar to the coastal lowlands of the city of Caraguatatuba, connecting to the Rodovia Rio-Santos (federal highway). As such, it is part of a series of Serra do Mar highways which include Rodovia Anchieta (SP-150) and Rodovia dos Imigrantes (SP-160), departing from São Paulo, the Mogi das Cruzes-Bertioga highway, and the Taubaté-Ubatuba highway. The SP-099 starts at the Rodovia Presidente Dutra, and crosses with Rodovia Carvalho Pinto (SP-070), two huge thoroughfares which direct the road flow from and to São Paulo megalopolis to the Northern coast beach resorts.

The road is thus named in order to remember the Tamoio, the ethnic group of original Indian tribes who inhabited the coast from Santos to Espírito Santo at the time of discovery, in 1500. It was managed and maintained by the Department of Roads of the State of São Paulo (DER) until April 18, 2015. Now it's maintained by Ecopistas and Concessionária Tamoios. Toll was not required until 2016.

The section crossing the Serra do Mar was a single-lane road until 2022, turning into a dual lane with the inauguration of a new 22-kilometre-long road for drivers heading uphill on the Serra do Mar towards São José dos Campos in 26 March 2022. The project, which took seven years to complete, required the excavation of 1.7 million cubic meters of rock and the construction of six viaducts and four tunnels in an investment of over 3 billion reais. One of the tunnels, with a length of 5,555 meters, is the longest road tunnel in Brazil.

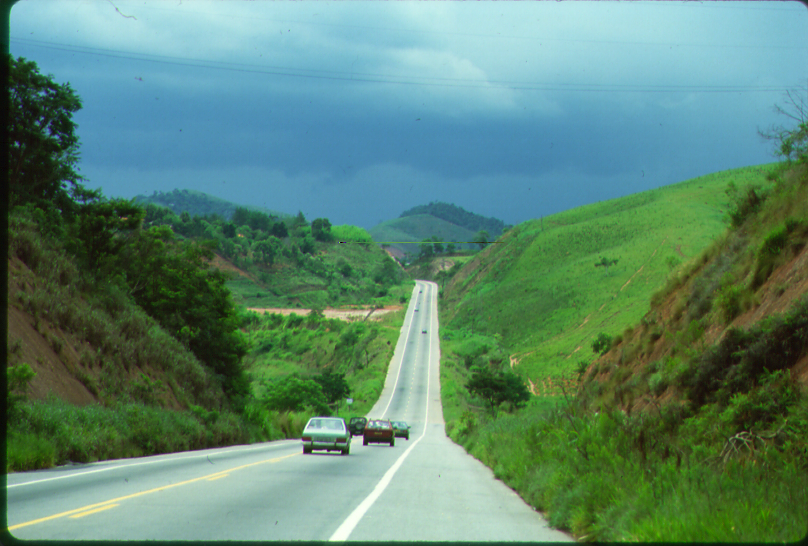
Rodovia dos Tamoios, looking South, in 1994.

== See also ==
- Highway system of São Paulo
