= Janaína Cunha =

Brazilian sitting volleyball player (born 1977)

Personal information
- Full name: Janaína Petit Cunha
- Born: 16 July 1977 (age 49); Suzano, São Paulo, Brazil
Medal record
Women's sitting volleyball
Representing Brazil
Paralympic Games
Bronze medal – third place	2016 Rio	Team
World Championship
Gold medal – first place	2022 Sarajevo	Team
Silver medal – second place	2026 Hangzhou	Team
Parapan American Games
Silver medal – second place	2015 Toronto	Team

Janaína Petit Cunha (born 16 July 1977) is a Brazilian sitting volleyball player. She won the bronze medal, Brazil's first in the sport, at the 2016 Summer Paralympics in Rio de Janeiro, representing her country after defeating the Ukrainian team by 3 sets to 0.
