= SP-31 (São Paulo highway) =

State highway in São Paulo, Brazil

SP-031

Route information
- Length: 37.2 km (23.1 mi)

Location
- Country: Brazil
- State: São Paulo

Highway system
- Highways in Brazil; Federal; São Paulo State Highways

SP-31 is a state highway in the state of São Paulo in Brazil.

== Description ==
The Rodovia Índio Tibiriçá is a highway that connects the municipality of São Bernardo do Campo to the municipality of Suzano, both located in the Metropolitan Region of São Paulo.

It is the main route linking the Alto Tietê Region to the ABC Paulista Region. The road also serves as an alternative for residents of the Alto Tietê area traveling to the Baixada Santista or the South Zone of São Paulo.

The road is named in honor of the Tupiniquim indigenous leader Tibiriçá, who played a significant role in the events leading to the founding of the city of São Paulo in 1554.

Key points along the route: SP-148 – Ribeirão Pires – SP-066 (Suzano)

== Characteristics ==
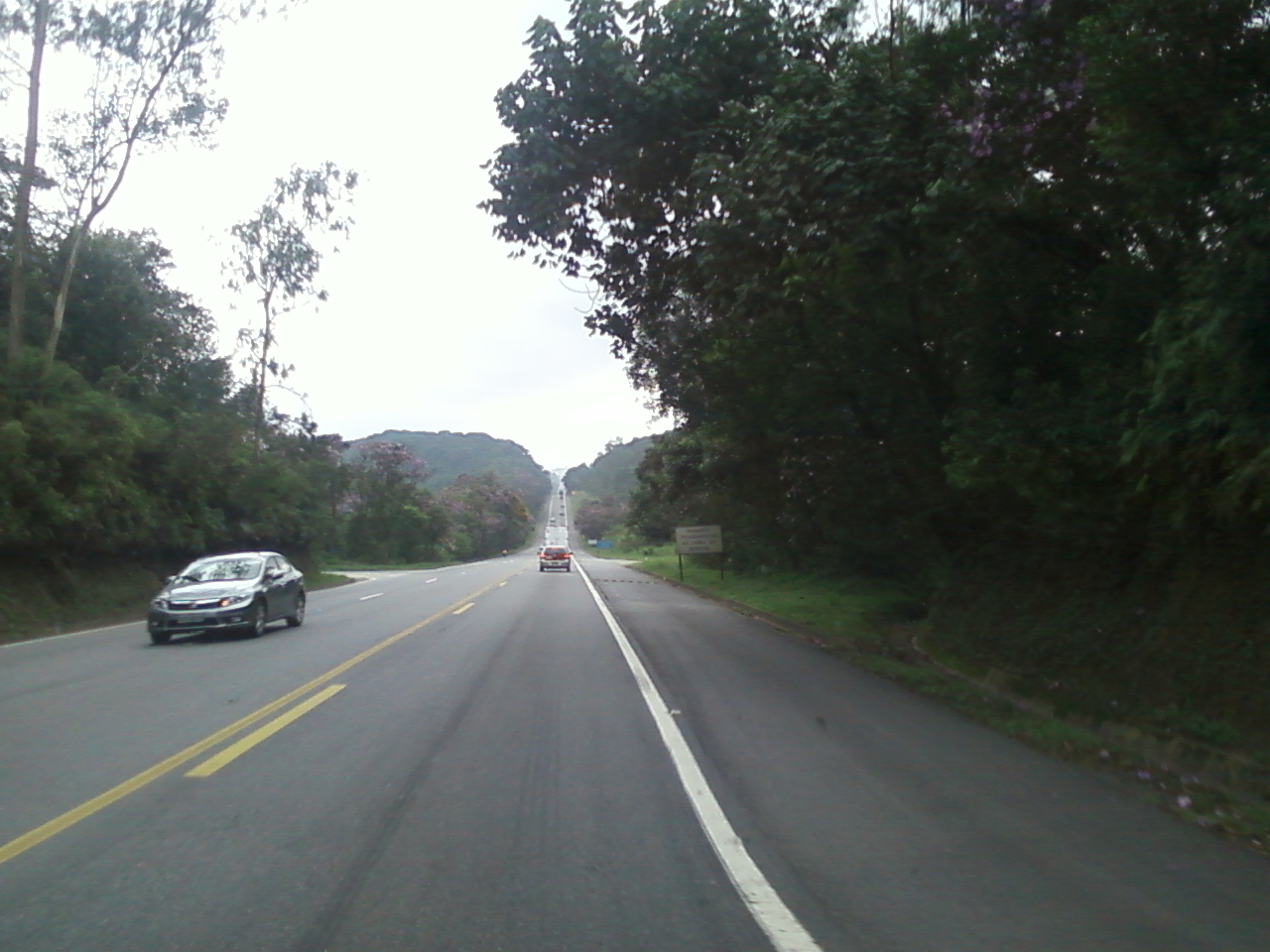
Section of SP-31

=== Length ===
- Initial km: 33.100
- Final km: 70.300

=== Municipalities served ===
- São Bernardo do Campo
- Santo André
- Ribeirão Pires
- Ouro Fino Paulista
- Palmeiras de São Paulo
- Suzano
