= SP-62 (São Paulo highway) =

State highway in São Paulo, Brazil

SP-062

Route information
- Length: 101.1 km (62.8 mi)

Location
- Country: Brazil
- State: São Paulo

Highway system
- Highways in Brazil; Federal; São Paulo State Highways

The SP-62 is a highway in the southeastern part of the state of São Paulo in Brazil. The highway is begins in the District of Eugenio de Mello and shares the route with SP-123 for a few kilometres and ends in Cachoeira Paulista.

== Highway sections ==
- Edmir Viana Moura, Mayor: Distrito Eugenio de Mello - Caçapava
- Vito Ardito De - até: Caçapava - SP-123
- Emilio Amadei Beringhs: SP-123 - Taubaté
- Amador Bueno da Veiga: Taubaté - Pindamonhangaba
- Abel Fabricio Dias, Vereador: Pindamonhangaba - Roseira
- Marieta Vilela da Costa Braga: Roseira - Aparecida
- Padroeira do Brasil: Aparecida - Guaratinguetá
- Aristeu Vieira Vilela, Mayor: Guaratinguetá - Lorena
- Oswaldo Ortiz Monteiro, Deputy: Lorena - Cachoeira Paulista
