= Suellen Cristine Delangelica Lima =

Brazilian teacher and sitting volleyball player (born 1989)

Personal information
- Born: 4 November 1989 (age 36); Suzano, Brazil

Volleyball information
- Position: opposite spiker
- Current team: Sesi de Suzano

National team
Brazil

Suellen Cristine Delangelica Lima (born 4 November 1989) is a Brazilian teacher and sitting volleyball player who plays as opposite spiker. She won bronze at the 2016 Summer Paralympics and silver at the 2017 Parapan American Zonal Tournament.

== Career ==
Lima works as a physical education teacher for children aged 6 to 10 and plays sitting volleyball internationally for Brazil. She began playing conventional volleyball aged 12.

Lima first competed at the Paralympics Games at the 2012 Summer Paralympics in London, England. The Brazilian sitting volleyball team came fifth overall.

In 2015, Lima was named Best Sitting Volleyball Player of the Year by the Brazilian Paralympic Committee. At the 2016 Summer Paralympics in Rio de Janeiro, Lima and the Brazilian team won the bronze medal, after defeating Ukraine 3–0.

At the 2017 Parapan American Zonal Tournament in Montreal, Canada, Lima and the Brazilian team won silver, placing second to team USA and ahead of team Canada. At the 2019 Parapan American Games

in Lima, Peru, she again won silver with the team. Lima did not compete at the 2020 Summer Paralympics in Tokyo, Japan, as she was focusing on her family and gave birth to a son named Murilo. She returned to the sport after his birth.

In the Brazilian team's first match of the 2024 Summer Paralympics in Paris, France, Lima contributed 23 points towards the match win, including 12 attacks and nine aces. The team eventually came fourth in the tournament.

At the 2025 Parapan American Zonal Tournament in Denver, Colorado, United States, Lima was named as Most Valuable Player (MVP) of the tournament.

As of 2024, Lima has won 17 Brazilian Championship titles.
