= Highway system of São Paulo =

The highway system of São Paulo is the second-largest statewide road transportation system in Brazil, with approximately 35,000 km. It consists of a hugely interconnected network of municipal (12,000 km), state (22,000 km) and federal (1,050 km) roads. More than 90% of the population is within 5 km of a paved road.

It has also the largest number of two-, four- and six-lane highways in Latin America. According to the National Confederation of Transports, it is the best highway grid in the country, with 49.4% classified as excellent and 27,7% as good.

The term used in Portuguese language for highway is rodovia, and for road is estrada.

== Management systems ==
The responsibility for building, maintaining, expanding, managing and exploiting the state roads fall into the following categories:

- DERSA Desenvolvimento Rodoviário S.A. A state-owned company, responsible for some state-built roads and highways, such as Rodovias Dom Pedro I, Carvalho Pinto, Ayrton Senna, etc. (see below for the names and specific information about highways);
- DER Departamento de Estradas de Rodagem. A state department belonging to the State Secretary of Transportation;
- Ministry of Transportation, responsible for the federal highways and roads crossing the state, such as Rodovias Presidente Dutra, Régis Bittencourt, Fernão Dias, etc.;
- Municipalities, responsible for vicinal roads and roads within counties.
- State concessions to private companies.

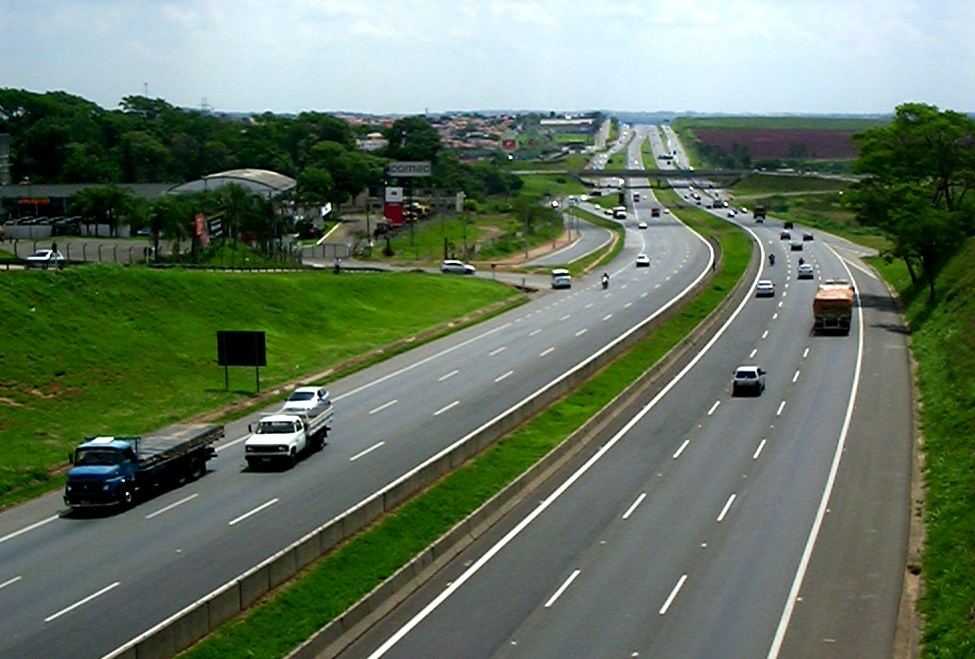
Rodovia Dom Pedro I near Campinas, shows the current engineering standard of highways in São Paulo state.

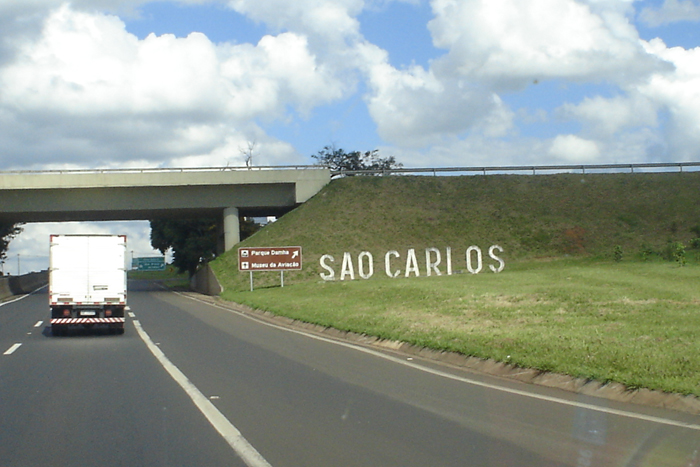
Washington Luís Highway near São Carlos, km 236 South.

By the law nº 9.361, of July 5, 1996, the state government implemented a comprehensive program of privatization and public concession of highway infrastructure management and economic exploitation (Programa Estadual de Desestatização - State Program of Desestatization), whereby most of the highways under the tutelage and built by the state began to be managed by private companies. In order to implement the Program, the highway grid was subdivided into 12 sections, with a total of 3,500 km, interconnecting 198 counties with a population of approximately 20 million inhabitants (54% of the state's population).

The following 12 companies were contracted under a public bidding system:

- AutoBAn, (owned by CCR S.A.)
- Autovias, (EixoSP, owned by Obrascón Huarte Lain)
- Centrovias, (EixoSP, owned by (Obrascón Huarte Lain)
- Colinas
- Ecovias
- Intervias
- Renovias
- SPVias, (owned by CCR S.A.)
- Tebe, (TEBE S.A.)
- Triângulo do Sol
- Viaoeste

Until August 2005, these companies had invested R$ 6 billion (approximately US$ 2,5 billion) and generated a revenue of R$ 2 billion for the state. The concessions led also to the duplication (double laning) of more than 480 km and the construction of 110 new roads. All conceded highways are equipped with fixed emergency phones every 1 km, horizontal and vertical signalling equipment, surveillance cameras, and round-the-clock, free-of-charge mechanical and emergency relief vehicles. which make São Paulo highways the most sophisticated and with the highest safety and service standards of Latin America.

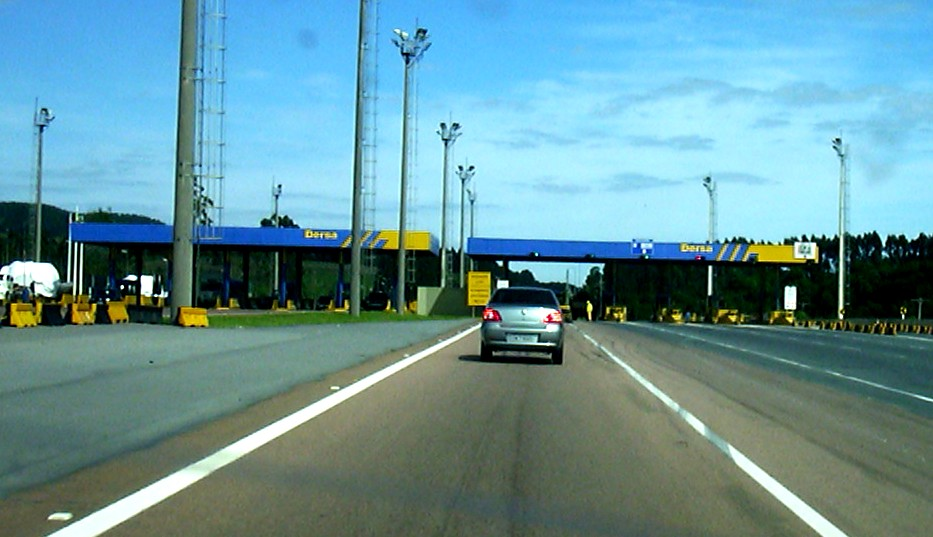
Typical DERSA toll gates at the Rodovia Dom Pedro I

All conceded roads, including those managed by DERSA, are toll roads, in order to pay for the services and investments. Roads managed by the state (DER) are generally not tolled. Toll collection is made in toll gates spaced along the road. Sometimes tolling occur only in one direction of the road, in other cases, in both directions. Toll pricing is set by the State Secretary of Transportation and vary from US$ 1 to US$ 4.

The entire São Paulo system of highways (16 in the total) use a unified non-stop electronic toll collection named "Sem Parar", based on RFID tags glued to the vehicle windshield, which comprises about 34% of the traffic through these roads. The system has 560,000 of these tags installed and generates 11 million of electronic transactions and revenues of ca. R$ 120 million (approximately US$ 52 million) per month.

== Naming and numbering system ==
Within São Paulo, numbering of highways works as follows, starting with letters SP:

- even numbers - indicates that the highway is radial, that is, connects the state capital to the interior. The number of the highway gives the clockwise angle that it makes with an imaginary line stemming from the state capital and extending northward. Thus SP-270 (Rodovia Raposo Tavares) starts in São Paulo and extends westward (thus a 270-degree clockwise angle with the imaginary north-extending line). Example: Rodovia Anhangüera, SP-330.
- odd numbers - indicates that the highway connects two or more places away from the capital. The number gives the distance, in km, between the capital and the nearest point of the highway. Thus, SP-425 (Rodovia Assis Chateubriand) connects two cities away from the capital, and its nearest point is distant 425 km from the state capital.

It is customary in Brazil, and particularly in São Paulo, to give also official names to the highways and roads, usually to pay homage to some politician, significant personality, national hero, etc., or to some symbolic or collective concept.

== Infrastructure ==
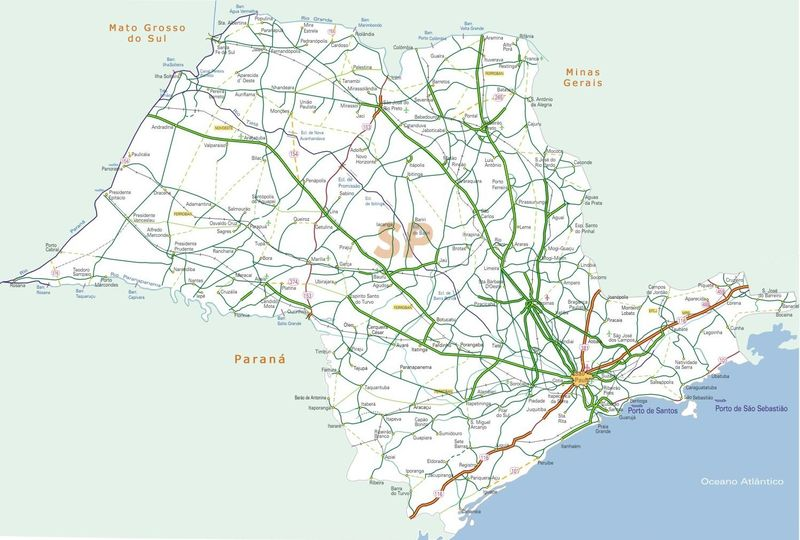
Highway Map of the State of São Paulo.

The main two-lane highways built and maintained by the state of São Paulo are:

- SP-340: Rodovia Adhemar de Barros
- SP-150: Rodovia Anchieta
- SP-330: Rodovia Anhanguera
- SP-322: Rodovia Attilio Balbo
- SP-070: Rodovia Ayrton Senna
- SP-348: Rodovia dos Bandeirantes
- SP-326: Rodovia Brigadeiro Faria Lima
- SP-070: Rodovia Carvalho Pinto
- SP-280: Rodovia Castelo Branco
- SP-320: Rodovia Euclides da Cunha
- SP-065: Rodovia Dom Pedro I
- SP-160: Rodovia dos Imigrantes
- SP-332: Rodovia Professor Zeferino Vaz
- SP-306: Rodovia Luís de Queiróz
- SP-300: Rodovia Marechal Cândido Rondon
- SP-270: Rodovia Raposo Tavares
- SP-075: Rodovia Santos Dumont
- SP-310: Rodovia Washington Luís

Other important double- or single-lane roads in the state are:

- SP-099: Rodovia dos Tamoios
- SP-123: Rodovia Floriano Rodrigues Pinheiro
- SP-425: Rodovia Assis Chateaubriand
- SP-101: Rodovia Jornalista Francisco Aguirre Proença
- SP-333 (Assis - State of Paraná): Rodovia Miguel Jubran

Three metropolitan beltways, or ring systems interconnect several highways, encircling the urban core of the cities of São Paulo, Campinas and Ribeirão Preto:

- Rodoanel Mário Covas (SP-21): around the city of São Paulo, currently interconnects the Anhangüera, Bandeirantes, Castelo Branco, Raposo Tavares, Régis Bittencourt, Imigrantes, Anchieta, Presidente Dutra and Ayrton Senna highways. Upon its completion, estimated for 2017, it will also interconnect the Fernão Dias highway.
- Anel Viário José Magalhães Teixeira (SP-83): around the city of Campinas, it interconnects the Bandeirantes and Dom Pedro I highways, also intersecting with Via Anhangüera.
- Anel Viário de Ribeirão Preto, around the city of Ribeirão Preto

There are also five federal highways which partially cross the state territory, namely:

- Rodovia Presidente Dutra, to Rio de Janeiro
- Rodovia Fernão Dias, to Belo Horizonte, state of Minas Gerais
- Rodovia Régis Bittencourt, to Curitiba, state of Paraná
- Rodovia Rio-Santos, between the cities of Santos and Rio de Janeiro
- Rodovia Transbrasiliana (BR-153) crossing from the state of Minas Gerais to Paraná

== See also ==
- Brazilian Highway System
