= Arujá =

Municipality in the state of São Paulo in Brazil

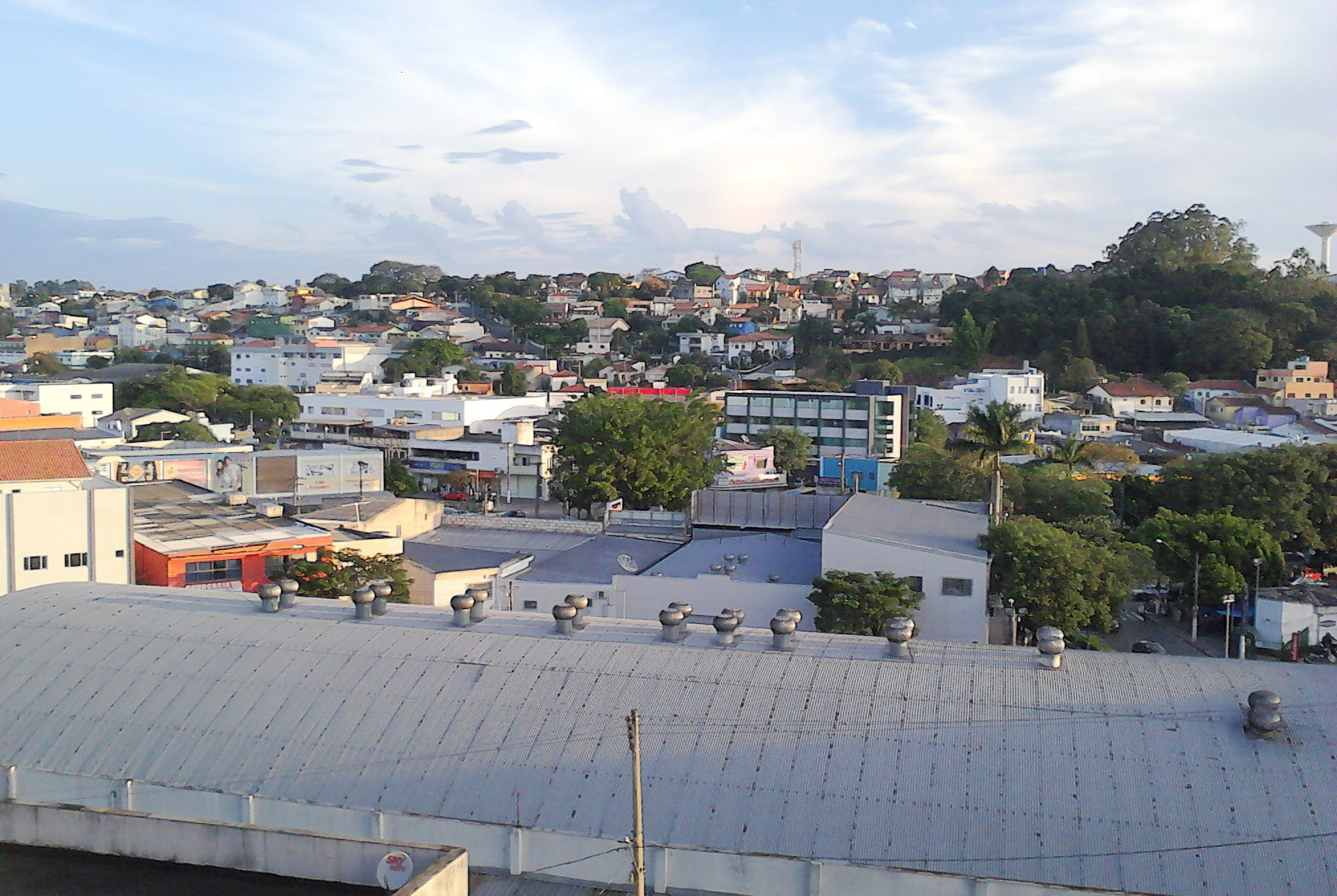
- View of downtown Arujá

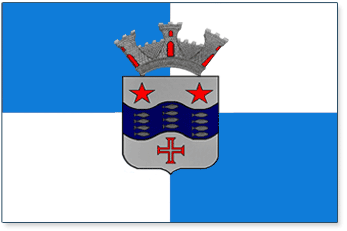
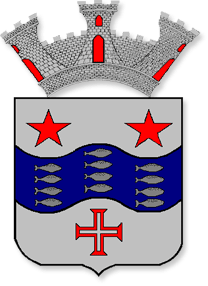
- Flag Coat of arms

- Location of Arujá

- Location within Brazil
- Coordinates: 23°23′48″S 46°19′16″W
- Country: Brazil
- Region: Southeast
- State: São Paulo
- Metropolitan Region: São Paulo

Government
  - Mayor: Luis Antonio de Camargo (PSD)

Area
  - Total: 96.17 km^{2} (37.13 sq mi)
- Elevation: 755 m (2,477 ft)

Population (2020)
  - Total: 91,157
  - Density: 947.9/km^{2} (2,455/sq mi)
- Time zone: UTC−3 (BRT)
- HDI (2000): 0,788 medium
- Website: Official website

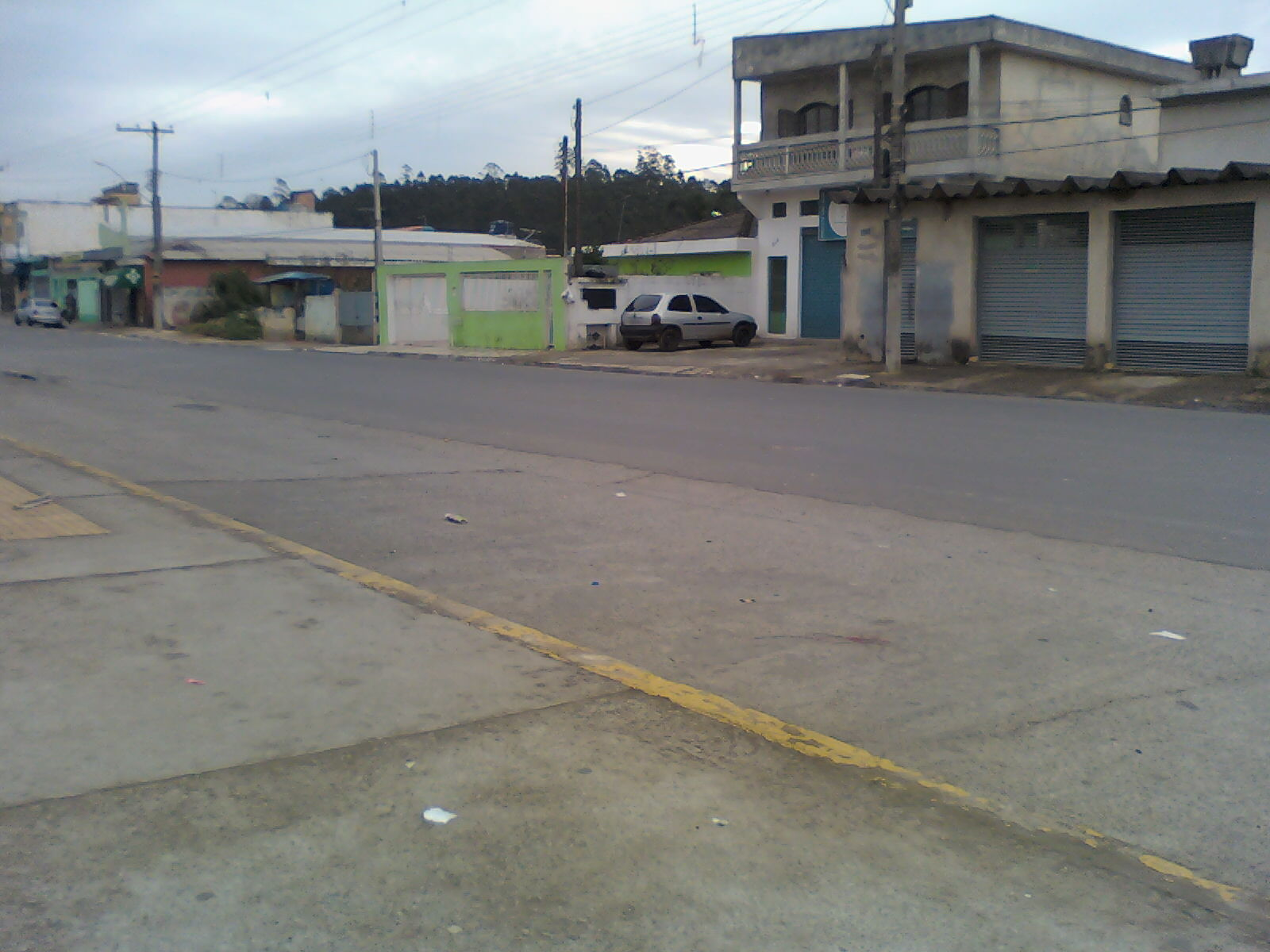
Residential street in Arujá, July 2011

Arujá is a city in the state of São Paulo in Brazil. It is part of the Metropolitan Region of São Paulo. The population is 91,157 (2020 est.) in an area of 96.17 km^{2} (37.13 sq mi). Its boundaries are Santa Isabel in the north and the northeast, Mogi das Cruzes in the southeast, Itaquaquecetuba in the south and Guarulhos to the west and the northwest.

The municipality contains part of the 292,000 hectares (720,000 acres) Mananciais do Rio Paraíba do Sul Environmental Protection Area, created in 1982 to protect the sources of the Paraíba do Sul river.

== Demography ==
=== Demographics ===
Historical population (municipality)
| Year | Population | %± |
|---|---|---|
| 1960 | 5,758 | — |
| 1970 | 9,571 | 66.2% |
| 1980 | 17,487 | 82.7% |
| 1991 | 37,622 | 115.1% |
| 2000 | 59,185 | 57.3% |
| 2010 | 74,905 | 26.6% |
| 2022 | 86,678 | 15.7% |

== Media ==
In telecommunications, the city was served by Companhia de Telecomunicações do Estado de São Paulo until 1975, when it began to be served by Companhia Telefônica da Borda do Campo. In July 1998, this company was acquired by Telefónica, which adopted the Vivo brand in 2012.

The company is currently an operator of cell phones, fixed lines, internet (fiber optics/4G) and television (satellite and cable).

== See also ==
- List of municipalities in São Paulo
