= SP-68 (São Paulo highway) =

State highway in São Paulo, Brazil

SP-068

Route information
- Length: 133 km (83 mi)

Location
- Country: Brazil
- State: São Paulo

Highway system
- Highways in Brazil; Federal; São Paulo State Highways

The SP-68 is a highway in the southeastern part of the state of São Paulo in Brazil. The highway name is the Rodovia Dos Tropeiros and runs from Cachoeira Paulista at the 37th km of Via Dutra to the state of Rio de Janeiro.
