= Rodovia Oswaldo Cruz =

State highway in São Paulo

SP-125

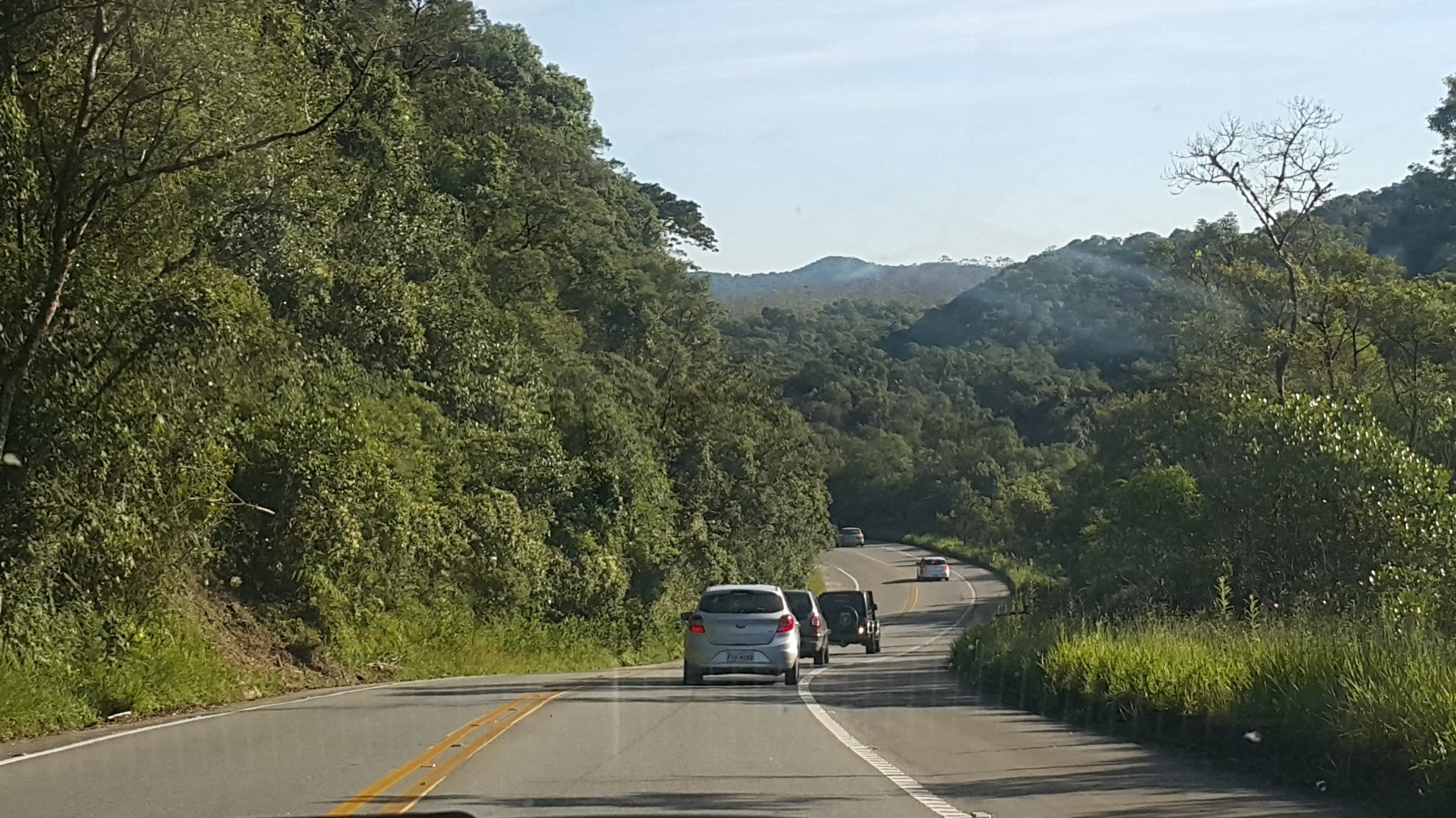

Route information
- Length: 94.500 km (58.720 mi)

Location
- Country: Brazil
- State: São Paulo

Highway system
- Highways in Brazil; Federal; São Paulo State Highways

Rodovia Oswaldo Cruz (official designation SP-125) is a state highway in the state of São Paulo in Brazil.
