= SP-88 (São Paulo highway) =

State highway in São Paulo, Brazil

SP-088

Route information
- Length: 103.750 km (64.467 mi)

Location
- Country: Brazil
- State: São Paulo

Highway system
- Highways in Brazil; Federal; São Paulo State Highways

The SP-88 is a highway in the southeastern part of the state of São Paulo in Brazil.

== Highway names ==
- Pedro Eroles, Rodovia Presidente Dutra - Mogi das Cruzes (km 32 - km 51)
- Alfredo Rolim de Moura, Professor, Mogi das Cruzes - SP-99 (km 57 - km 135)
