= Santa Isabel, São Paulo =

Santa Isabel
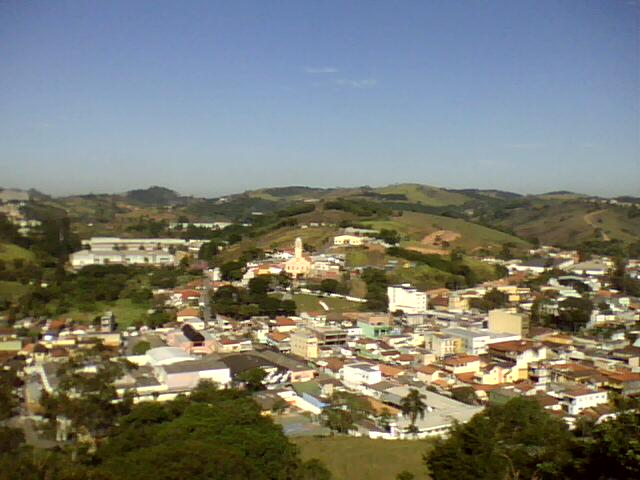

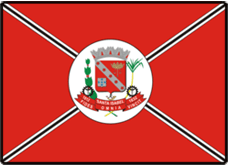
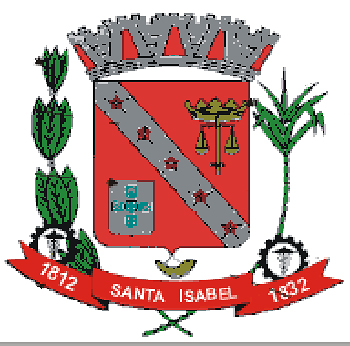
- Flag Coat of arms
- Nickname: Paraíso da Grande São Paulo ("Greater São Paulo's paradise")
- Location of Santa Isabel

- Location within Brazil
- Coordinates: 23°18′57″S 46°13′15″W
- Country: Brazil
- Region: Southeast
- State: São Paulo

Government
  - Mayor: Carlos Augusto Chinchilla Alfonzo (PODE)

Area
  - Total: 363.33 km^{2} (140.28 sq mi)

Population (2020)
  - Total: 57,966
  - Density: 159.54/km^{2} (413.21/sq mi)
- Time zone: UTC−3 (BRT)
- HDI (2000): 0,766 medium
- Website: Santa Isabel City Hall

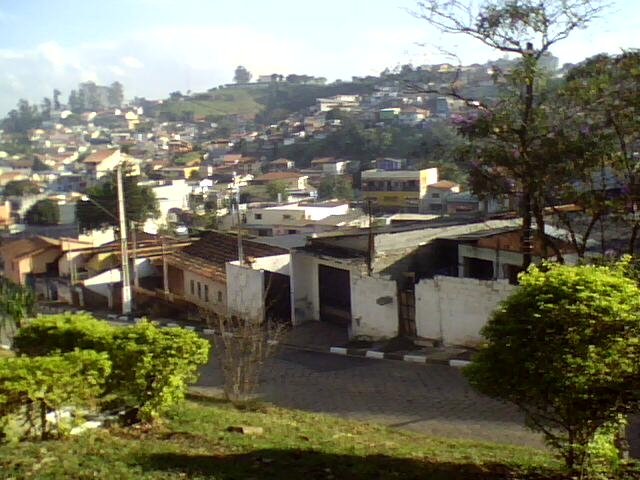
Street Juscelino Kubitschek in Vila Nova Santa Isabel.

Santa Isabel (Portuguese pronunciation: [ˈsɐ̃tɐ jzɐˈbɛw]) is a municipality in the state of São Paulo in Brazil. It is part of the Metropolitan Region of São Paulo. The population is 57,966 (2020 est.) in an area of 363.33 km^{2} (140.28 sq mi). The elevation is 655 m. It is located 60 miles east of the downtown of the city of São Paulo.

== History ==
The town of Santa Isabel was named after a Portuguese queen, Isabel or Elizabeth of Aragon (b. 1271- d. 1336), who was canonized by Pope Urban VIII in 1625. The town was founded in the 18th century.

== Geography ==
Santa Isabel belongs to the Guarulhos macro region, thus it is part of the Greater São Paulo region as well. The municipality lies in the basins of the Rio Jaguari and the Rio Paraíba do Sul and 84% of the municipality is protected by environmental laws because of its significance as a potable water source The municipality contains part of the 292,000 hectares (720,000 acres) Mananciais do Rio Paraíba do Sul Environmental Protection Area, created in 1982 to protect the sources of the Paraíba do Sul.

The area suffered ecologically from unauthorized uses and in 1996 the Ibirapitanga Reserve on the Rio dos Pilões was created to preserve one of the last stands of Brazilian Atlantic forest and to permit managed urban growth.

== Media ==
In telecommunications, the city was served by Companhia de Telecomunicações do Estado de São Paulo until 1975, when it began to be served by Companhia Telefônica da Borda do Campo. In July 1998, this company was acquired by Telefónica, which adopted the Vivo brand in 2012.

The company is currently an operator of cell phones, fixed lines, internet (fiber optics/4G) and television (satellite and cable).

== Notable people ==
- Mauricio de Sousa: (born 1935), the creator of Turma da Mônica

== See also ==
- List of municipalities in São Paulo
