= Guararema =

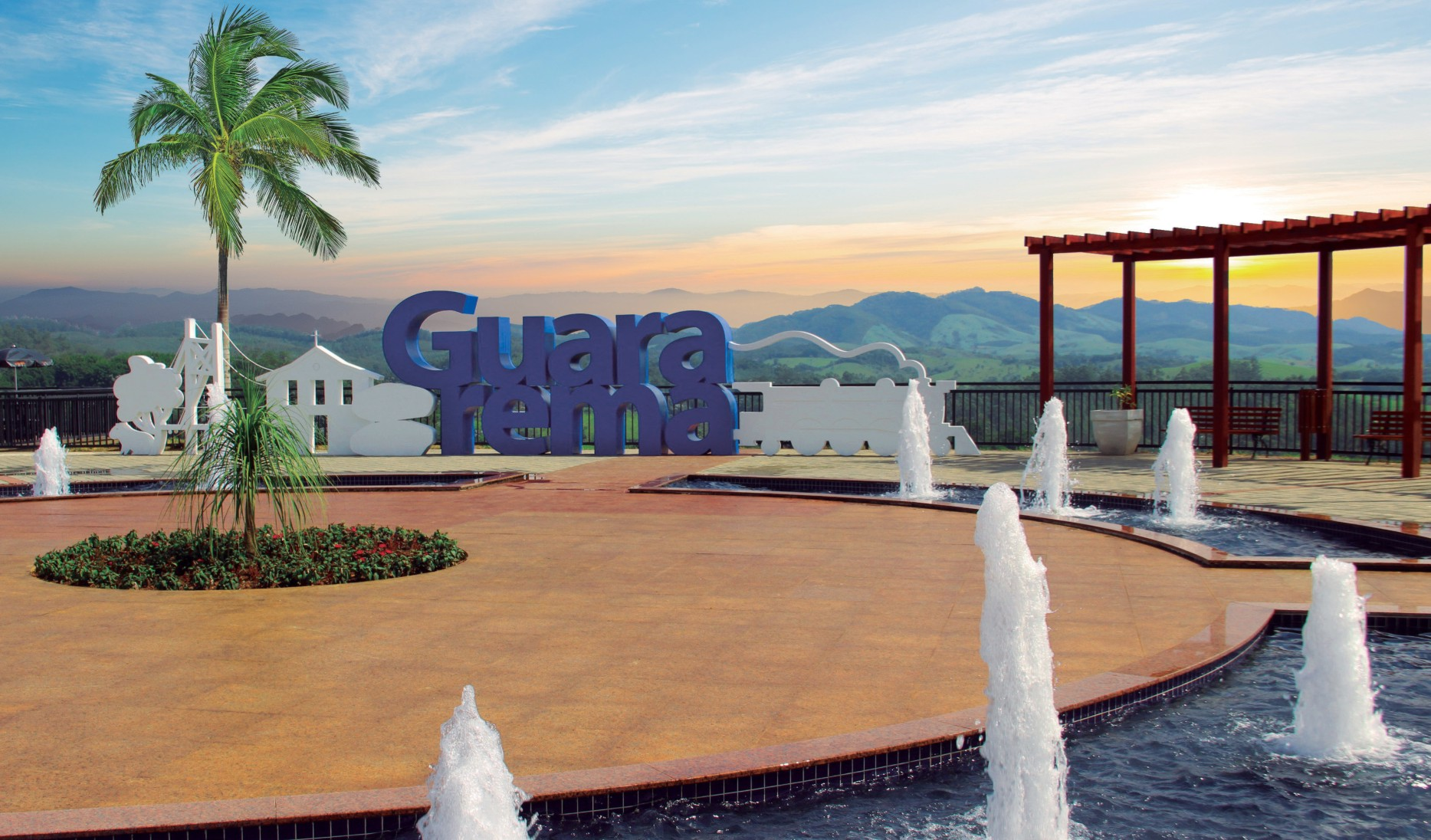
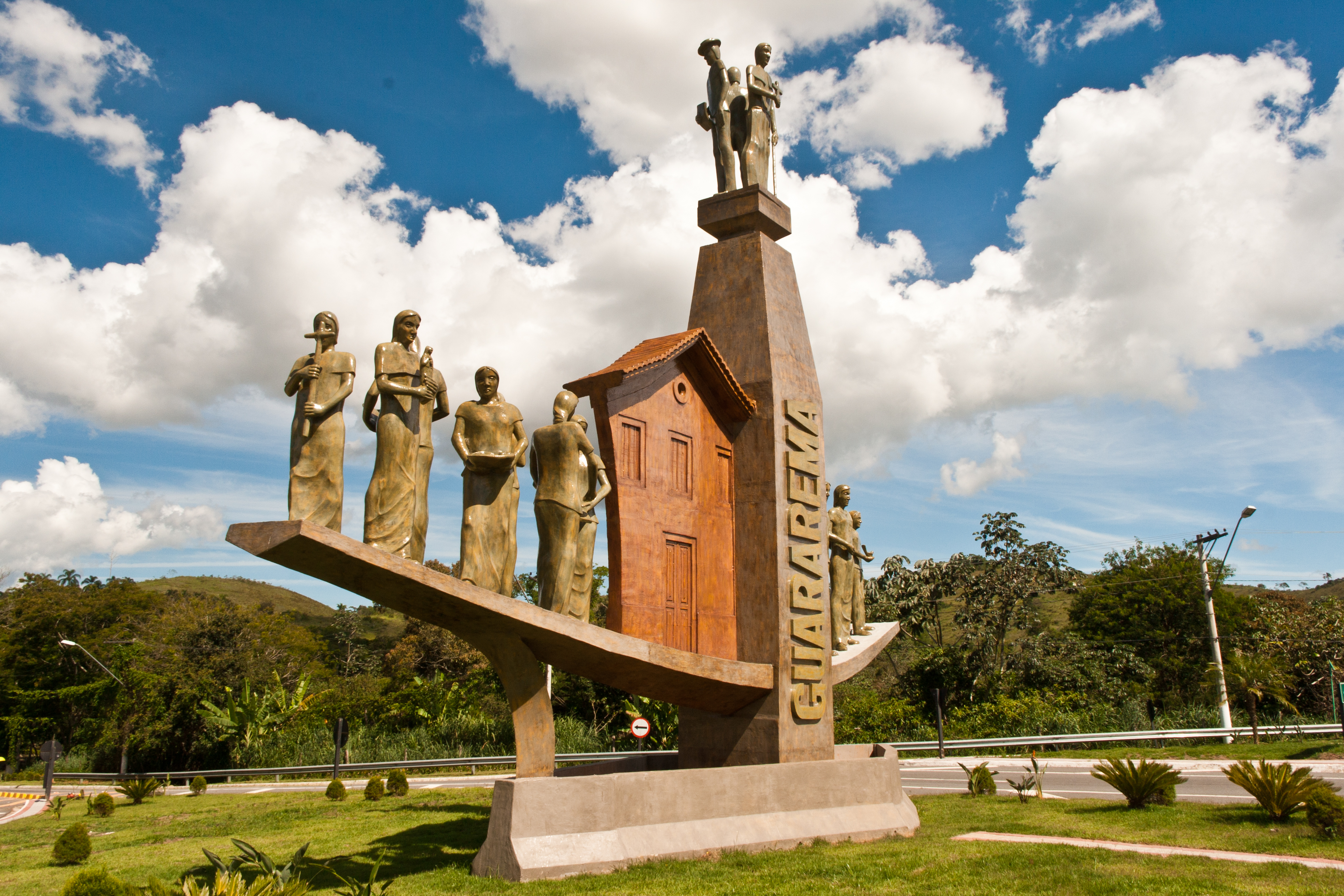
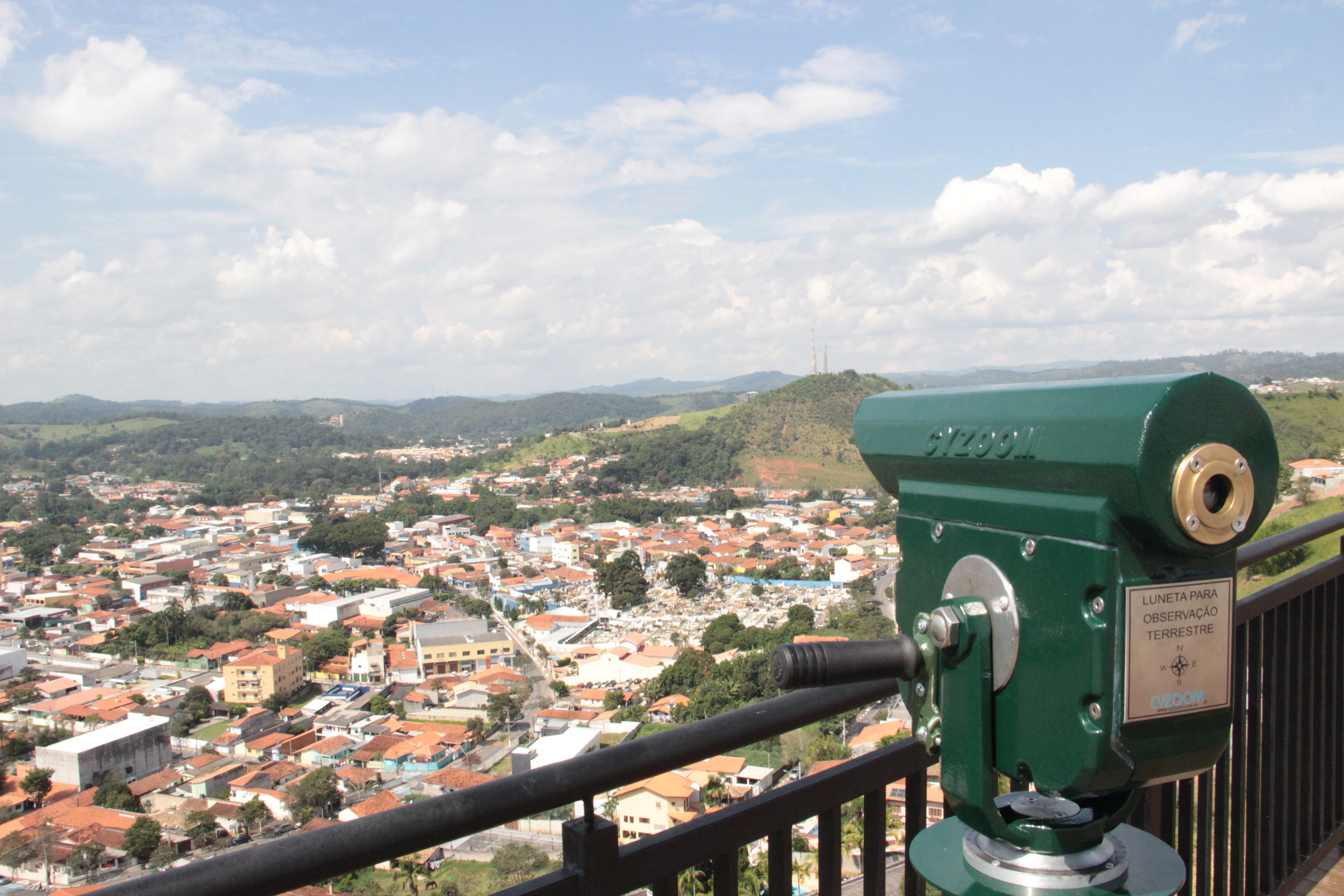
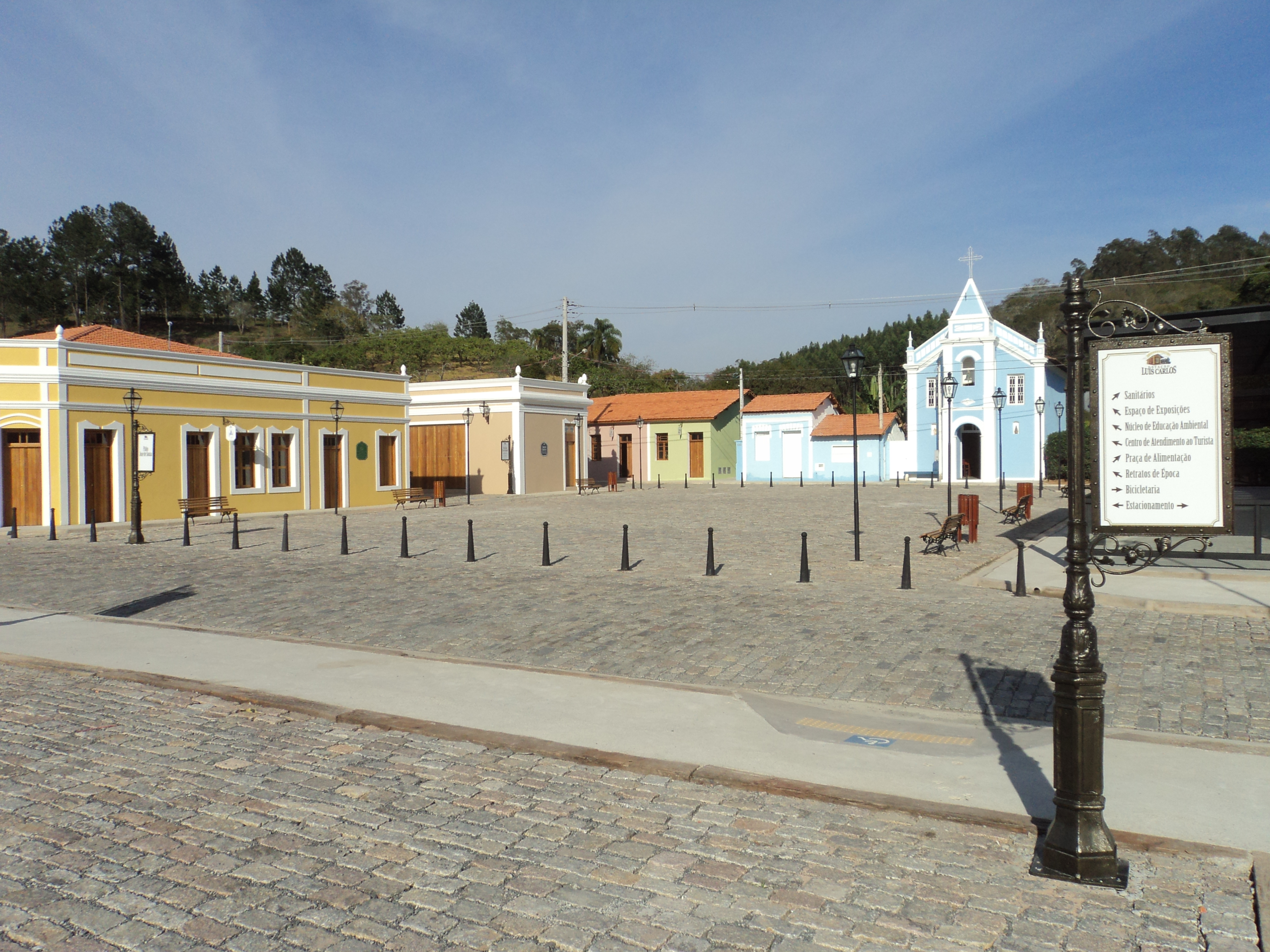
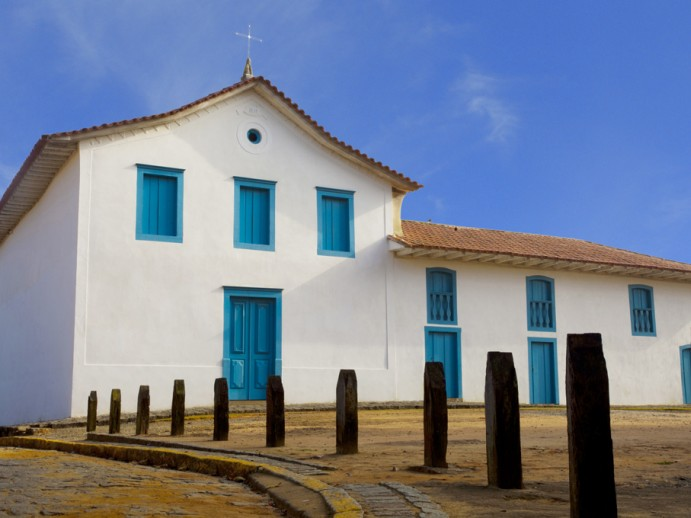
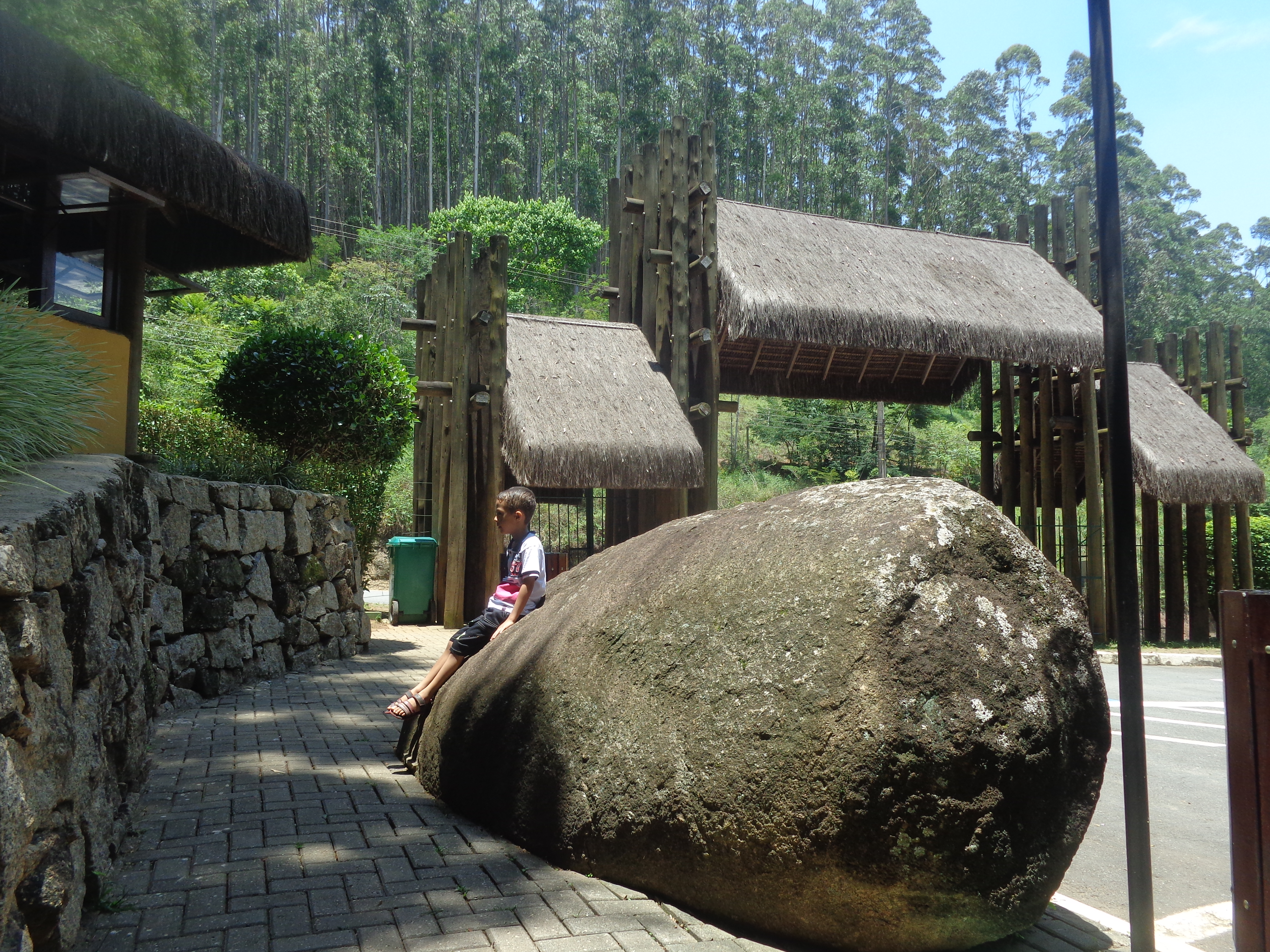
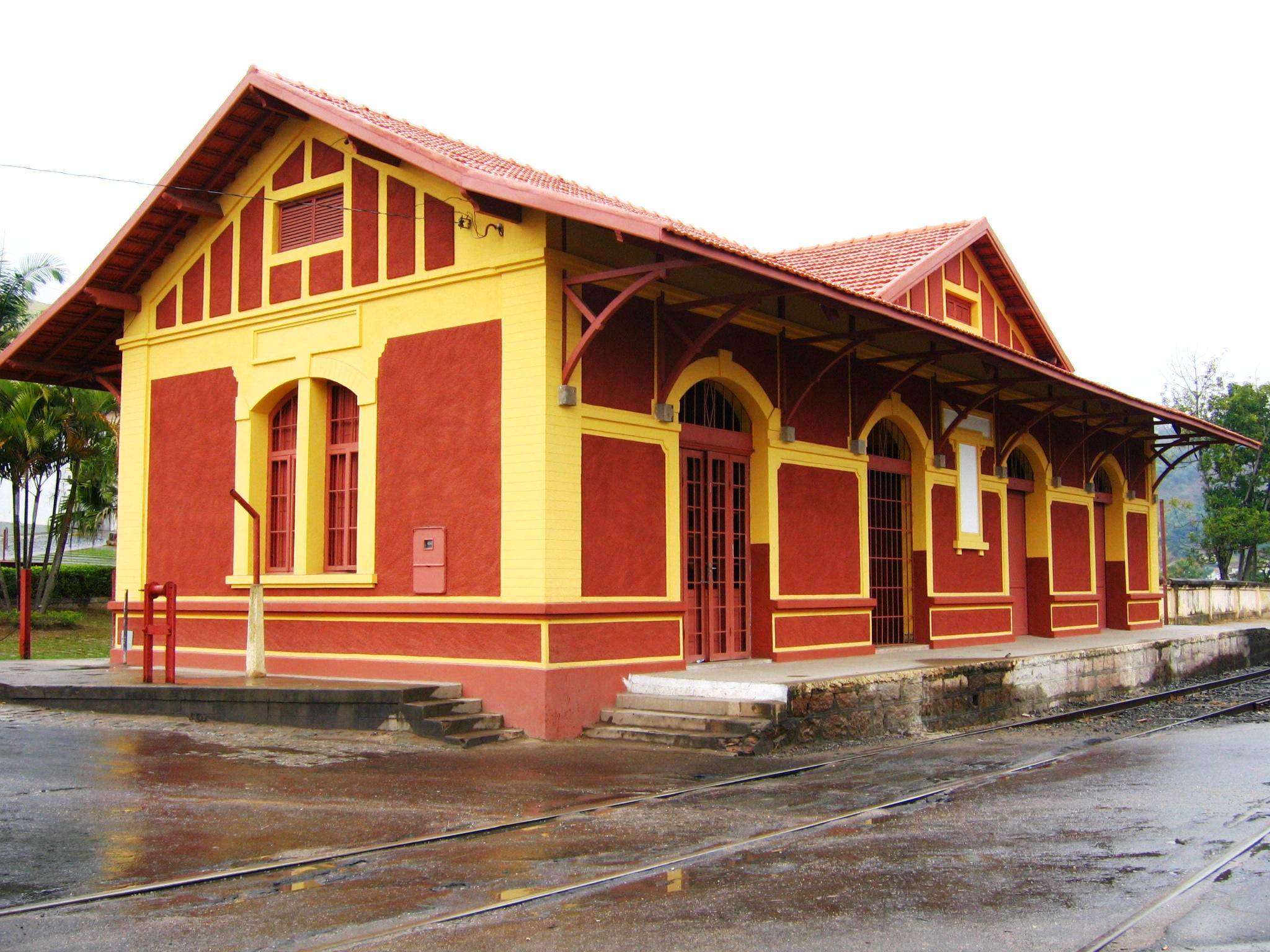

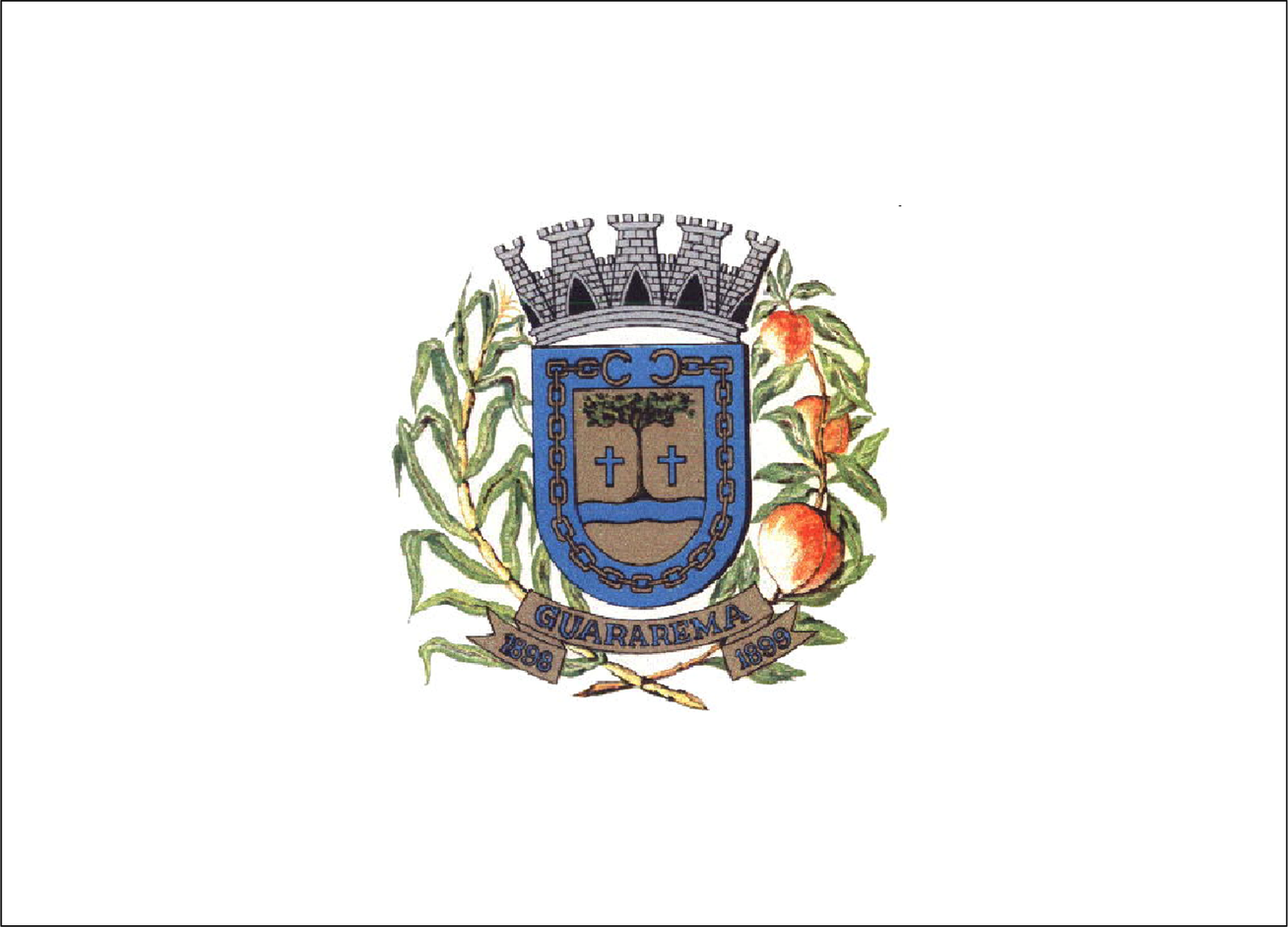
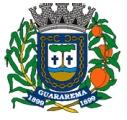
- Flag Coat of arms

- Location of Guararema

- Location within Brazil
- Coordinates: 23°24′54″S 46°02′06″W
- Country: Brazil
- Region: Southeast
- State: São Paulo

Area
  - Total: 270.82 km^{2} (104.56 sq mi)
- Elevation: 585 m (1,919 ft)

Population (2020)
  - Total: 30,136
  - Density: 111.28/km^{2} (288.21/sq mi)
- Time zone: UTC−3 (BRT)
- Website: Guararema

Guararema is a municipality in the state of São Paulo in Brazil. It is part of the Metropolitan Region of São Paulo. The population is 30,136 (2020 est.) in an area of 270.82 km^{2}. The Florestan Fernandes School of the Landless Workers' Movement is located here.

== Media ==
In telecommunications, the city was served by Companhia Telefônica da Borda do Campo. In July 1998, this company was acquired by Telefónica, which adopted the Vivo brand in 2012. The company is currently an operator of cell phones, fixed lines, internet (fiber optics/4G) and television (satellite and cable).

== See also ==
- List of municipalities in São Paulo
