= Rio Grande da Serra =

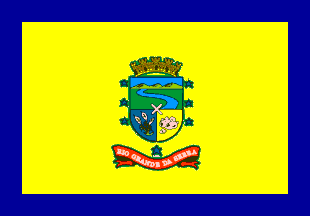
- Flag Coat of arms

- Location of Rio Grande da Serra

- Location within Brazil
- Coordinates: 23°44′38″S 46°23′52″W
- Country: Brazil
- Region: Southeast
- State: São Paulo

Government
  - Mayor: Claudio Manoel Melo (PODE)

Area
  - Total: 36.34 km^{2} (14.03 sq mi)
- Elevation: 780 m (2,560 ft)

Population (2020)
  - Total: 51,436
  - Density: 1,415/km^{2} (3,666/sq mi)
- Time zone: UTC−3 (BRT)
- HDI (2000): 0.764 – medium
- Website: Rio Grande da Serra

Rio Grande da Serra (Great River of the Mountain Chain) is a municipality in the state of São Paulo in Brazil. It is located approximately 49 kilometres (30 mi) by road southeast of the centre of the city of São Paulo. It is part of the Metropolitan Region of São Paulo. The population is 51,436 (2020 est.) in an area of 36.34 km^{2}.

== History ==
=== Early period ===
The earliest date recorded in the history of Rio Grande da Serra is May 26, 1560 when land was allotted in Jeribatiba, the third village developed by the Jesuits. To meet local needs, salt had to be brought from the port of São Vicente up to the Alto da Serra highlands via the village now known as Paranapiacaba. In 1640, the Marquês de Alegretti officially renamed Jeribatiba "Rio Grande". The mode of transport was donkeys during that period and Mogi das Cruzes, founded in 1640, rapidly became the largest settlement. Salt was transported along the so-called Caminho do Mar (sea road) to Alto da Serra, also locally known as Zanzaláh. One of the Jesuits who died on this route was buried with a wooden cross which in 1611 was converted into a chapel, now known as the Capela de São Sebastião.

=== Nineteenth century ===
In 1840, General Antônio Manuel de Melo built a ranch on the road from Mogi das Cruzes to São Paulo. In 1855, a cholera epidemic caused devastation in the region.Until the nineteenth century, the inhabitants had been engaged in pastoral activities. On February 16, 1867, the São Paulo Railway reached Rio Grande, enabling coffee beans and timber to be transported to São Paulo. As a result, the development of Rio Grande boomed, However. it also resulted in the influx of expatriates mostly from England who established a new town at Paranapiacaba, a few miles away. The railroad encouraged the development of coal mining from 1880 and by 1895, that of manganese and graphite extraction and as well as mineral water. Expatriates from Italy, Germany and Switzerland came to work at Rio Grande from 1899 onwards.

=== History ===
Work on the canalization of the Rio Grande river was initiated in 1906. In 1918, graphite industry was established. 1920 marked the first telephone connection. In 1927, São Paulo municipality acquired Pedreira, a suburb of Rio Grande, bringing new factories with opportunities for employment. In 1928, an electric power station was built. Between 1930 and 1954 many small scale industries, extensive housing facilities, marketing centers and factories manufacturing all types of goods were set up. Schools, sports centers, musical events, carnivals and religious festivals emerged. After all these developments the town, Rio Grande da Serra, was given the status of municipality in 1964. Population growth in Rio Grande da Serra was slow until the mid-1970s, when there was an influx of migrants, mostly miners which has lasted until today, although the increase is now falling.

== Geography ==
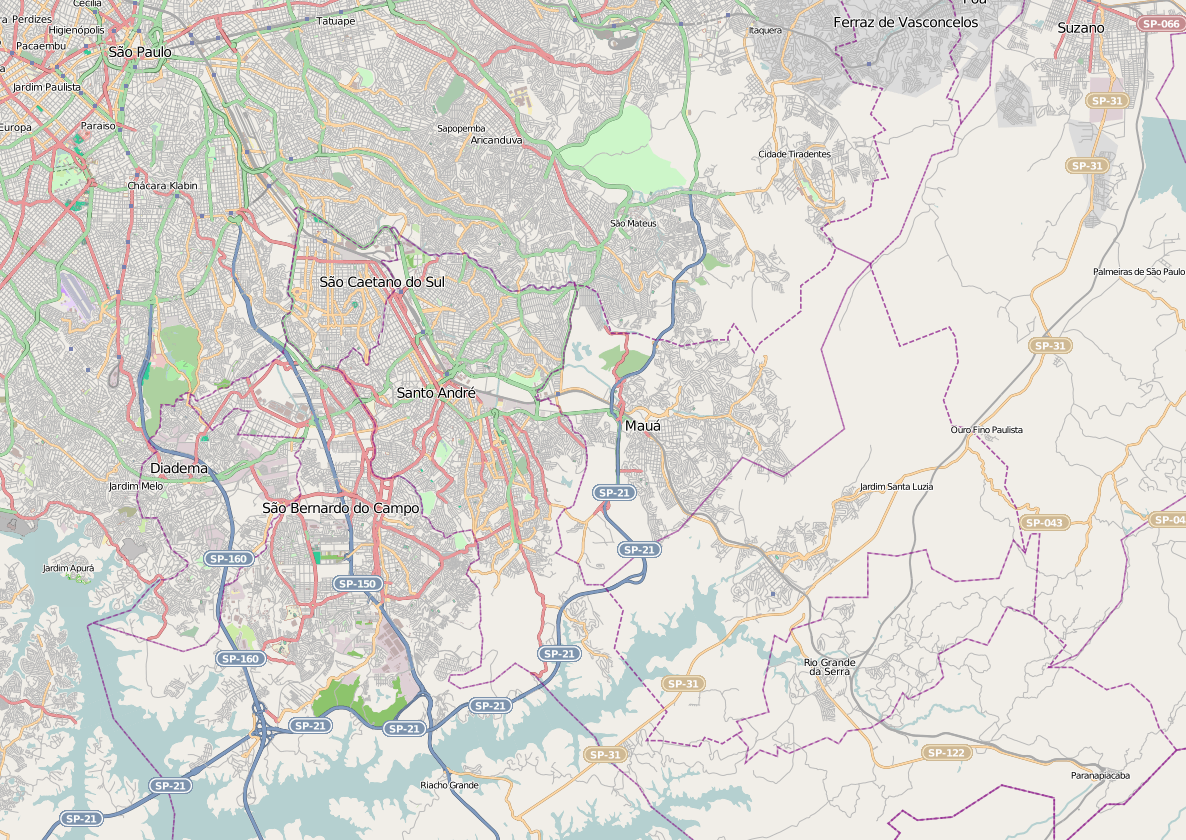
Map

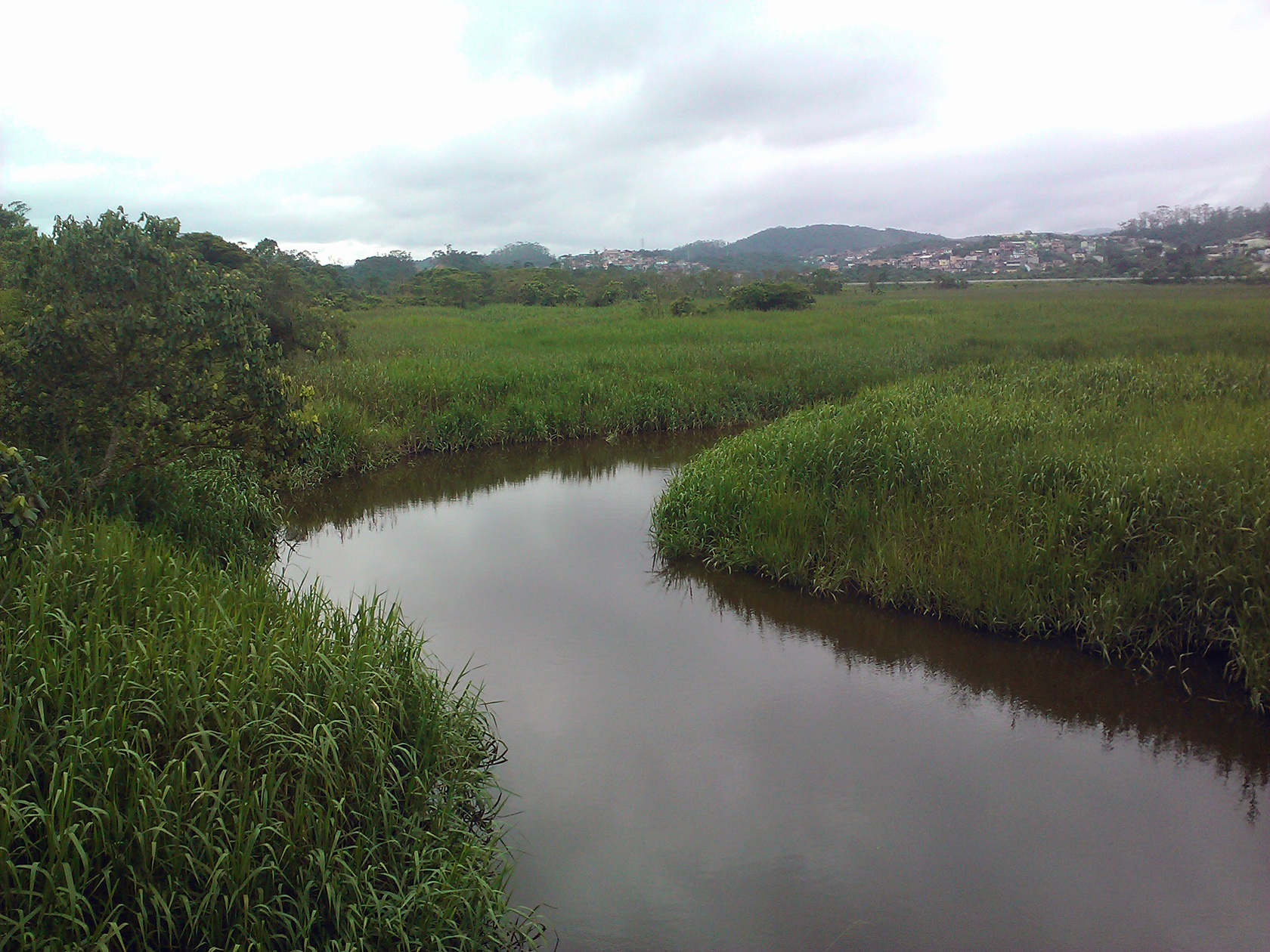
Rio do Cloro

Rio Grande da Serra is one of the 39 municipalities (Prefeituras) in the state of São Paulo under the federal government of Brazil. The municipality is located approximately 49 kilometres (30 mi) by road to the southeast of the centre of the city of São Paulo according to Google Maps, 55 kilometres (34 mi) according to the municipal authorities. Under the Greater ABC region, its neighboring municipalities are Santo André, Ribeirão Pires and Suzano. It covers an area of 36.7 square kilometres (14.2 sq mi). With the city of São Paulo and the municipalities of Diadema, Mauá, Ribeirão Pires, Santo André, São Bernardo do Campo and São Caetano do Sul, it forms part of the Microregion of São Paulo. The principal road is SP-122 (Rodovia Deputado Antônio Adib Chammas), which links to Ribeirão Pires and Paranapiacaba. Paranapiacaba is a historical site approached by road (15 minutes drive) from Rio Grande da Serra, which has train link with Luz Station (Estaco da Luz) in São Paulo. The nearest international airport is the Cumbica at Guarulhos which is quite far from the city of São Paulo.

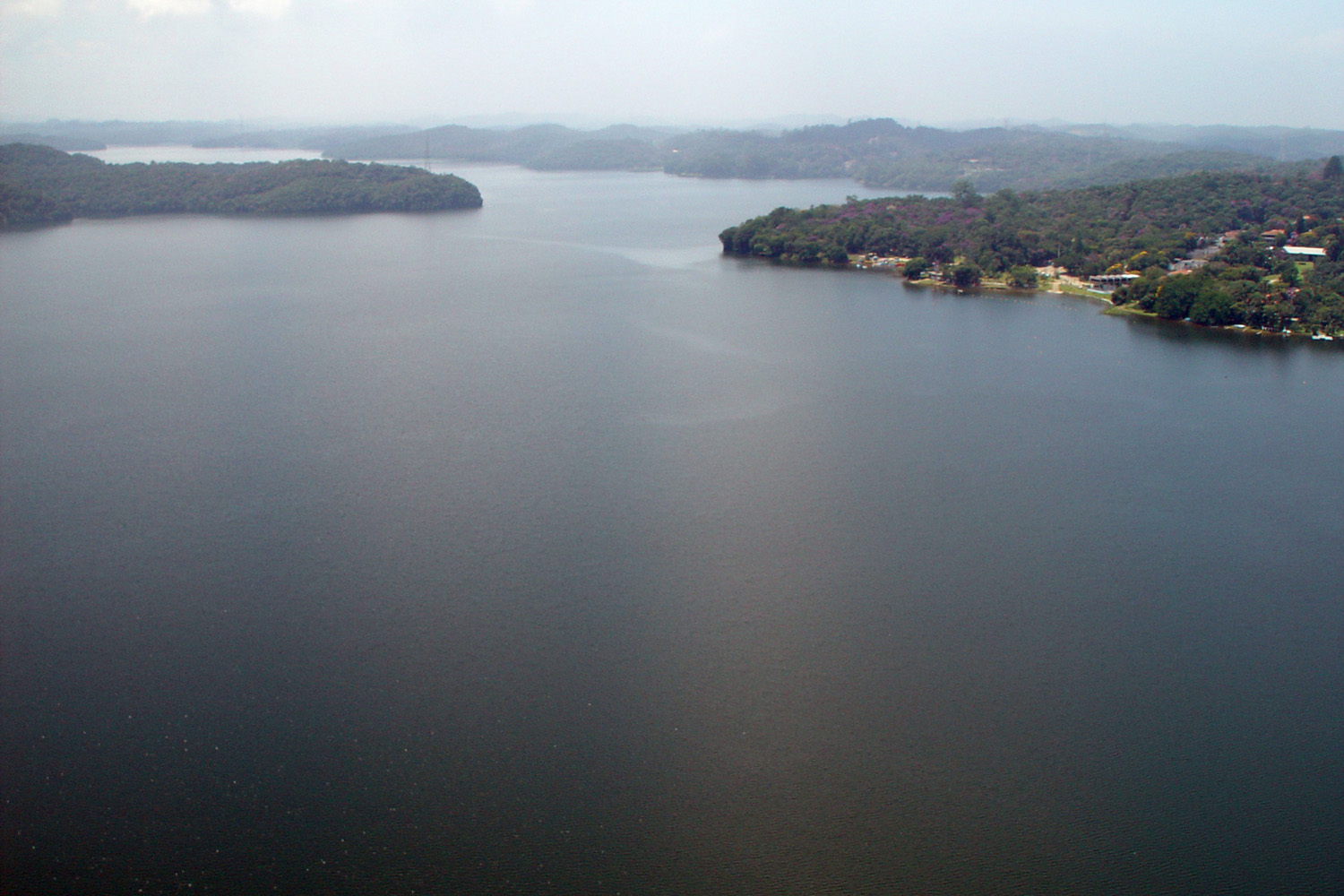
Billings Reservoir

The Rio Grande River Basin, with its tributaries, form part of the municipality, with the "Rio Grande arm" of the Billings Reservoir and Dam which is its most significant geographical feature, covering a total of 127 square kilometres (49 sq mi). It is named after Asa White Kenney Billings, the United States hydroelectric engineer who was instrumental in building it. The reservoir supplies about 1.8 million people, and also is used for fishing and swimming. In addition to Rio Grande da Serra and São Paulo, the Billings sub-basin includes Diadema, Ribeirao Pires, Santo Andre, and Sao Bernardo do Campo. Besides the Rio Grande and Billings Reservoir and dam, the municipality has a lot of streams and creeks, such as the streams of Figueira, Cloro, and Piolzinho.

Within the city limits, the forests areas and wetlands are stated to be well conserved, including wild animals and birds. Its rainforests are also protected under suitable environmental laws.

=== Climate ===
The climate of the city, and across the Metropolitan Region of São Paulo, is subtropical. Summers are hot and rainy, winters are mild, with a constant haze between May and October. The average annual temperature is around 18 °C, with the coldest month being July (average 14 °C) and the hottest in February (average 22 °C). Annual rainfall is around 1,400 mm.

Climate data for Rio Grande da Serra, Brazil (Average)
Month	Jan	Feb	Mar	Apr	May	Jun	Jul	Aug	Sep	Oct	Nov	Dec	Year
Mean daily maximum °F (°C)	81 (27)	83 (28)	81 (27)	77 (25)	74 (23)	71 (22)	71 (22)	73 (23)	73 (23)	77 (25)	78 (26)	79 (26)	83 (28)
Mean daily minimum °F (°C)	67 (19)	67 (19)	66 (19)	63 (17)	59 (15)	56 (13)	55 (13)	56 (13)	57 (14)	60 (16)	63 (17)	65 (18)	55 (13)
Average rainfall inches (mm)	9.5 (240)	8.0 (200)	5.6 (140)	2.3 (58)	1.7 (43)	1.5 (38)	1.1 (28)	1.4 (36)	2.3 (58)	5.9 (150)	4.8 (120)	7.8 (200)	51.9 (1,311)

== Demography ==
The population of the municipal town is 44,000, which over an area of 36.7 square kilometres (14.2 sq mi) gives a population density of 1,198 inhabitants /km^{2}. Its Human Development growth Index (HDI) is reported to be 0.764. The rate of Infant Mortality is 18.38 per thousand inhabitants and life expectancy is 74 years. The urbanization rate is reported to be 10%.

== Economy ==
The city's economy is dependent on ecotourism, family farming, intensive farming, cooperatives and small non-polluting industries. Fishing is practiced on the Billings Reservoir. However, the issue of disposal of city waste water and sewerage directly into the reservoir from the city is still an issue needing a solution.

Economic activities in the form of small-scale craft industries in wood craft, dehydration of leaves, among others, sculptures, fabric dolls, decorated boxes, ornaments, jewelry, paintings, artifacts from recycled material have also provided job opportunities to some artisans. The southeast on the road to Paranapiacaba is a large industrial complex. A quarry began operations in 1927; the railway communications enabled fast shipment of mined material. In 1931, the city of São Paulo signed an agreement with Light & Power to provide energy and extend the operation of the quarry. The quarry operations were terminated in the 1970s but it is still reputed to be the largest quarry in Latin America at more than 640 metres (2,100 ft) long and 70 metres (230 ft) high and it is used as a climbing venue.

== Notable landmarks ==
Capela de São Sebastião was established in 1611. It is a white-washed structure in the colonial style. In 1906, a sculpture of Saint Sebastian was added to the church. The distinctive light blue and white Our Lady of Grace Chapel (Igreja Nossa Senhora das Graças), accessed via a steep flight of steps, was established in 1949. The church has its feast day on November 27. Estação Ferroviária, the railway station was inaugurated on 18 February 1867. Casa dos Castelucci and Casa família Rago are notable houses in the town.

== Education ==
The town is served by several schools, including:

- State School Prof. Francisco Lourenco de Melo - Vila Tsuzuki
- State School Luiz Edmundo de Nobrega Teixeira - Santa Tereza
- State School Prof. Sebastião Vayego de Carvalho - Vila Conde
- Escola Estadual Padre Giuseppe Pisoni - Vila Lopes
- State School Teacher Alziro Barbosa Nascimento - Vila St John
- Lucas Antonio State School - New Horizon
- State School Poet Cora Coralina - America Park
- Roberto Carlos Guariento State School - Vila Niwa

== Media ==
In telecommunications, the city was served by Companhia Telefônica da Borda do Campo. In July 1998, this company was acquired by Telefónica, which adopted the Vivo brand in 2012. The company is currently an operator of cell phones, fixed lines, internet (fiber optics/4G) and television (satellite and cable).

== Gallery ==
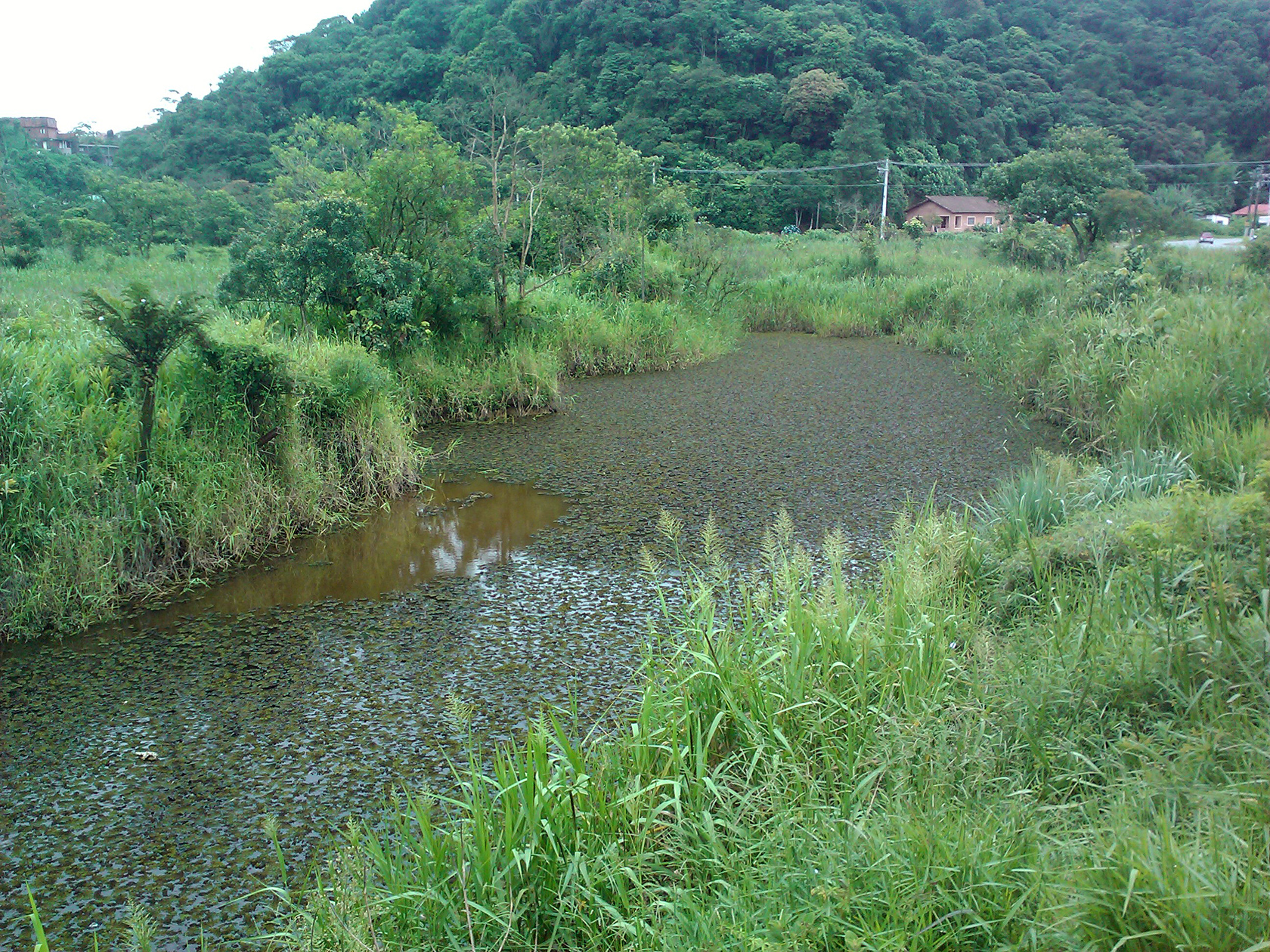
A natural pond in Rio Grande da Serra

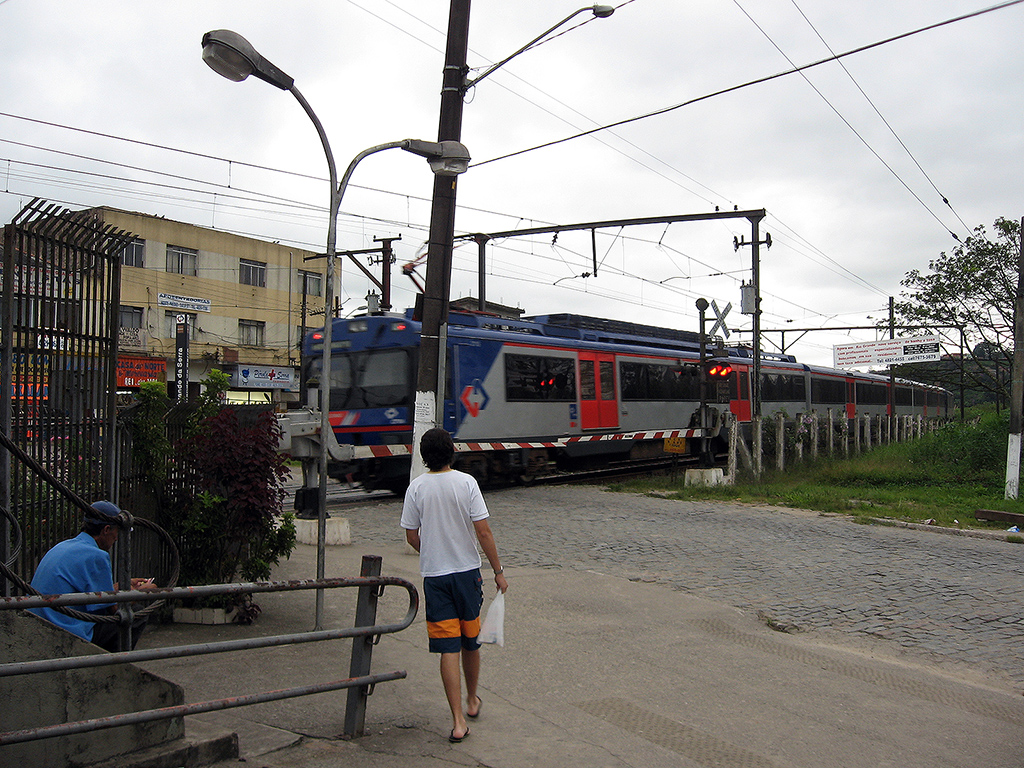
A train leaving the Rio Grande da Serra station

== See also ==
- List of municipalities in São Paulo
