= Climate of Southeast Brazil =

Climate types of Southeast Region.

The climate of Southeast Brazil is quite diverse in temperature. This is due to the latitudinal position around the Tropic of Capricorn, the very uneven topography, and disturbed circulation systems which greatly influence the climatology of the region.

The annual medium temperature ranges from 20 °C (68 °F) as seen on the border between São Paulo and Paraná to 24 °C (75 °F) in the north of Minas Gerais, while in the elevated areas of the Serra do Espinhaço, Serra da Mantiqueira and Serra do Mar the average medium temperature can be below 18 °C (64 °F) due to the combined effect of the latitude with the frequency of the polar currents.

In the summer, mainly in the month of January, the normal average temperatures range from 30 to 32 °C (86 to 90 °F) in the valleys of the rivers São Francisco and Jequitinhonha, in the Zona da Mata (Forest Zone) of Minas Gerais, in the coastal lowlands and to the west of the state of São Paulo.

In the winter, the normal average temperatures range from 6 to 20 °C (43 to 68 °F) with minimum absolute from −4 to 8 °C (25 to 46 °F), the lowest temperatures being at the highest elevations. Vast areas of Minas Gerais and São Paulo register occurrences of frosts, after the passage of the polar fronts.

As far as the incidence of rain is concerned, there are two areas with heavy precipitation: one following the coast and the Serra do Mar, where the rains are precipitated by the southerly currents; and the other from the west of Minas Gerais to the Municipal district of Rio de Janeiro, where the rains are brought by the Westerly system. The annual precipitation total in these areas is in excess of 1,500 mm (59.1 in). In the Serra da Mantiqueira these indexes surpass 1,750 mm (68.9 in), and at the summit of Itatiaia, 2,340 mm (92.1 in).

In the Serra do Mar, in São Paulo, it rains on the average more than 3,600 mm (141.7 in). Near Paranapiacaba and Itapanhaú maximum rainfall was measured at 4,457.8 mm (175.50 in) in one year. In the valleys of the rivers Jequitinhonha and Doce the smallest annual pluviometric indexes are recorded at around 900 mm (35.4 in).

The maximum pluviometric index of the Southeast area usually occurs in January and the minimum in July, while the dry period is usually concentrated in the winter, lasting six months in the case of the valleys of the rivers Jequitinhonha and São Francisco, to as little as two months in the Serra do Mar and Serra da Mantiqueira.

== Charts of selected cities ==
Belo Horizonte

Climate chart (precipitation, max. and min. temperature)
J	F	M	A	M	J	J	A	S	O	N	D
296 28 18	188 28 19	163 28 18	61 27 17	28 26 15	15 25 13	15 24 13	13 26 14	41 27 16	124 27 17	229 27 18	320 27 18
- █ Average max. and min. temperatures in °C
- █ Precipitation totals in mm
Imperial conversion
J	F	M	A	M	J	J	A	S	O	N	D
12 82 64	7.4 82 66	6.4 82 64	2.4 81 63	1.1 79 59	0.6 77 55	0.6 75 55	0.5 79 57	1.6 81 61	4.9 81 63	9 81 64	13 81 64
- █ Average max. and min. temperatures in °F
- █ Precipitation totals in inches

Campos do Jordão

Climate chart (precipitation, max. and min. temperature)
J	F	M	A	M	J	J	A	S	O	N	D
275 23 13	242 24 13	201 23 12	90 22 9	76 19 6	47 18 5	37 18 4	40 20 4	85 21 7	153 22 10	183 22 11	277 23 12
- █ Average max. and min. temperatures in °C
- █ Precipitation totals in mm
Imperial conversion
J	F	M	A	M	J	J	A	S	O	N	D
11 73 55	9.5 75 55	7.9 73 54	3.5 72 48	3 66 43	1.9 64 41	1.5 64 39	1.6 68 39	3.3 70 45	6 72 50	7.2 72 52	11 73 54
- █ Average max. and min. temperatures in °F
- █ Precipitation totals in inches

Campinas

Climate chart (precipitation, max. and min. temperature)
J	F	M	A	M	J	J	A	S	O	N	D
280 30 20	216 30 20	162 30 20	59 28 18	63 26 15	35 25 13	43 25 12	23 27 14	60 28 16	124 29 18	156 29 18	204 30 19
- █ Average max. and min. temperatures in °C
- █ Precipitation totals in mm
Imperial conversion
J	F	M	A	M	J	J	A	S	O	N	D
11 86 68	8.5 86 68	6.4 86 68	2.3 82 64	2.5 79 59	1.4 77 55	1.7 77 54	0.9 81 57	2.4 82 61	4.9 84 64	6.1 84 64	8 86 66
- █ Average max. and min. temperatures in °F
- █ Precipitation totals in inches

Rio de Janeiro

Climate chart (precipitation, max. and min. temperature)
J	F	M	A	M	J	J	A	S	O	N	D
114 29 23	104 30 23	104 29 23	137 28 22	86 27 21	81 25 19	56 26 18	51 26 19	86 25 19	89 26 20	97 27 22	170 29 22
- █ Average max. and min. temperatures in °C
- █ Precipitation totals in mm
Imperial conversion
J	F	M	A	M	J	J	A	S	O	N	D
4.5 84 73	4.1 86 73	4.1 84 73	5.4 82 72	3.4 81 70	3.2 77 66	2.2 79 64	2 79 66	3.4 77 66	3.5 79 68	3.8 81 72	6.7 84 72
- █ Average max. and min. temperatures in °F
- █ Precipitation totals in inches

São Paulo

Climate chart (precipitation, max. and min. temperature)
J	F	M	A	M	J	J	A	S	O	N	D
239 27 18	218 28 18	160 27 18	76 25 16	74 23 13	56 22 12	43 22 12	38 23 13	81 24 14	124 24 15	145 26 16	201 26 17
- █ Average max. and min. temperatures in °C
- █ Precipitation totals in mm
Imperial conversion
J	F	M	A	M	J	J	A	S	O	N	D
9.4 81 64	8.6 82 64	6.3 81 64	3 77 61	2.9 73 55	2.2 72 54	1.7 72 54	1.5 73 55	3.2 75 57	4.9 75 59	5.7 79 61	7.9 79 63
- █ Average max. and min. temperatures in °F
- █ Precipitation totals in inches
