= ABC Region =

Industrial region in Greater São Paulo, Brazil

Coordinates: 23°39′57″S 46°32′30″W

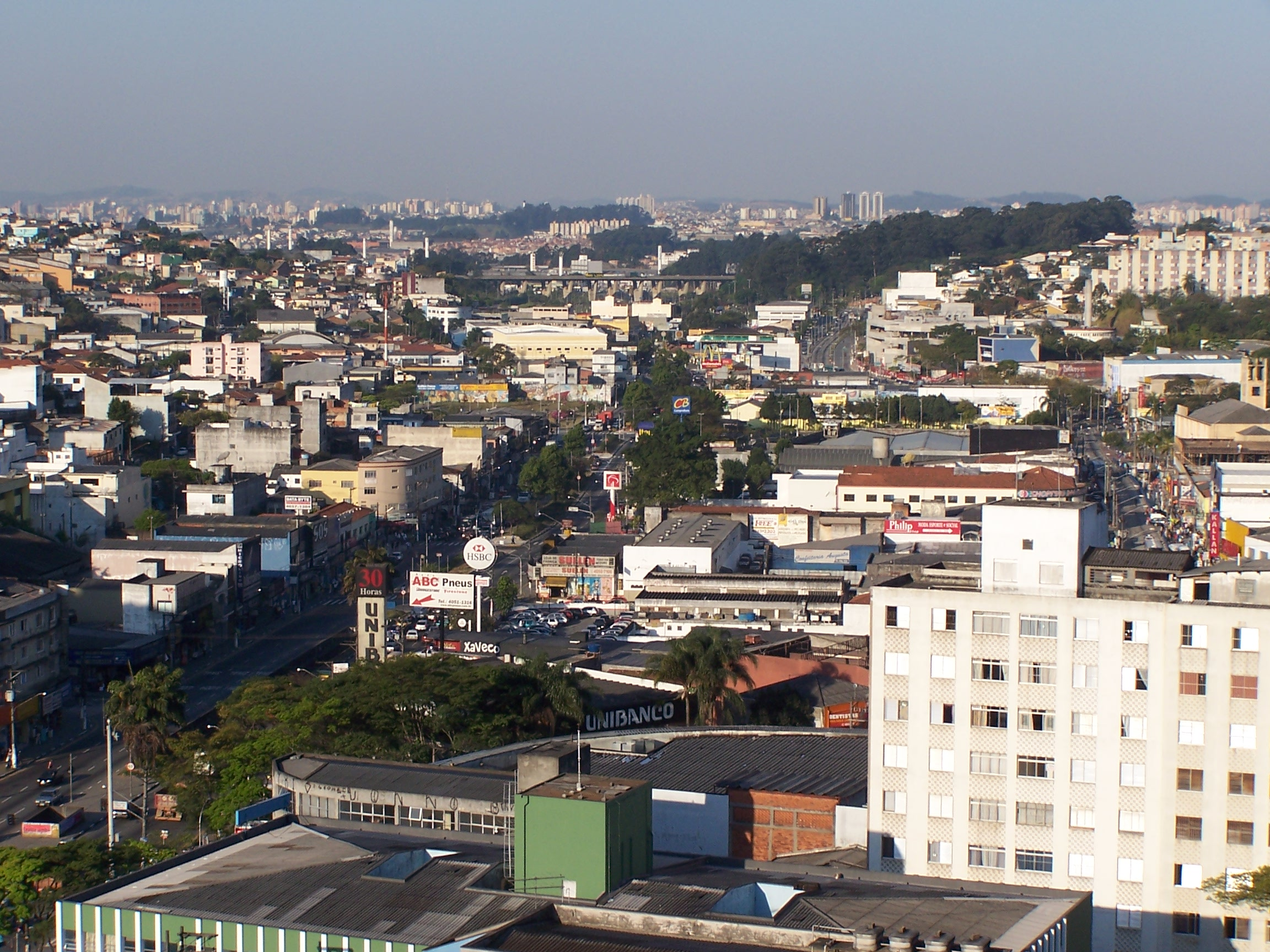
Industrial centre Diadema

The ABC Region, also known as ABC Paulista, is an industrial region in Greater São Paulo, Brazil.

The name refers to three smaller cities south of São Paulo, capital of the Brazilian state of the same name. Originally, these three cities were Santo André, São Bernardo do Campo, and São Caetano do Sul. Later, the region became known as the ABCD, with the addition of the city of Diadema, and sometimes even as ABCDMRR, with the addition of Mauá, Ribeirão Pires, and Rio Grande da Serra. The ABC region is widely known in Brazil and abroad because of the great number of international companies, particularly car manufacturers, in its area. National media and organizations consider the ABC region a powerful industrial pole and birthplace of the labor union movement that fought against the military dictatorship in the 1970s and 1980s. In this region the Workers' Party (PT) was formed, whose activities and popularity launched Luiz Inácio Lula da Silva, or simply Lula, to the presidency of Brazil in 2002. In 2006, the Federal University of ABC was established as a research and higher learning institution, with two campi and centers for Engineering, Modeling and Applied Social Sciences (CECS), for Mathematics, Computing and Cognition (CMCC) and for Natural and Human Sciences (CCNH).

== General aspects ==
Although they do not contribute to the original acronym, Mauá, Ribeirão Pires, Rio Grande da Serra (as they were an extension of the municipality of Santo André, before the division) and Diadema are also part of the region. The Billings Reservoir bathes 6 of the 7 municipalities in the region, except São Caetano do Sul. The 7 municipalities together make up an area of 825 km², and have a population of over 2.5 million inhabitants (IBGE estimate for 2007).

== Municipalities ==
Municipality	Area (km^{2})	Population (2022)	HDI (2010)	Ref.
Diadema	30.732	393,237	0.757	
Mauá	61.909	418,261	0.766	
Ribeirão Pires	99.175	115,559	0.762	
Rio Grande da Serra	36.671	44,170	0.774	
Santo André	175.782	748,919	0.815	
São Bernardo do Campo	409.532	810,729	0.805	
São Caetano do Sul	15.331	165,655	0.862	
Total	829.132	2,696,530		

== See also ==
- BRT ABC
- Diadema
- Federal University of ABC
- Mauá
- Ribeirão Pires
- Rio Grande da Serra
- Santo André
- São Bernardo do Campo
- São Caetano do Sul
