= Billings Reservoir =

Reservoir in the state of São Paulo in Brazil

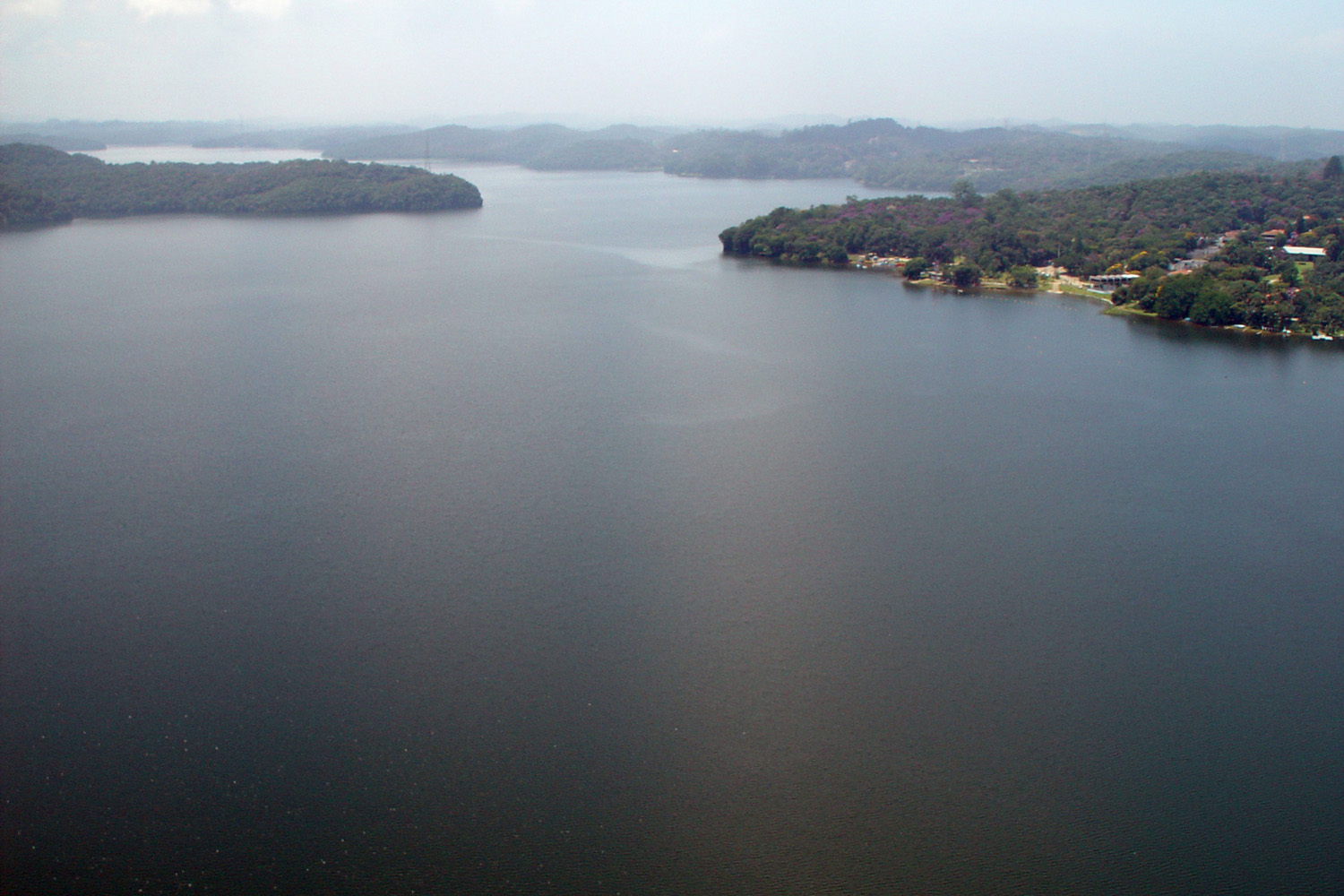

- Location within São Paulo state Location within Brazil
- Interactive map of Billings Reservoir
- Location: Santo André, São Bernardo do Campo, Diadema, Ribeirão Pires, Rio Grande da Serra, São Paulo
- Coordinates: 23.787°S 46.584°W
- Type: reservoir
- Basin countries: Brazil
- Built: 1935
- Max. length: 20.36 miles (32.77 km)
- Max. width: 1.27 miles (2.04 km)
- Surface area: 127 km^{2} (49 sq mi)
- Surface elevation: 751 metres (2,464 ft)
- Islands: numerous islands and islets

The Billings Reservoir (locally known as Represa Billings) is the largest reservoir in São Paulo, Brazil, covering a total of 127 km^{2} (49 sq mi). It is named after Asa White Kenney Billings, the American hydroelectric engineer who was instrumental in building it. The Portuguese word represa also means "dam".

The reservoir supplies about 1.8 million people, and also is used for fishing and swimming. In recent years, there have been problems with wastewater and garbage such as plastic bottles, as well as problems associated with unapproved human settlement in the surrounding regions.

== History ==
The hydroelectric projects were built starting in 1927, and the first phase was completed between 1935 and 1937. The project was started by the São Paulo Tramway, Light and Power Company, Limited (a company headquartered in Canada, with British and other foreign capital), today AES Eletropaulo. Water is drawn from the basin of the high Tietê River to Henry Borden hydroelectric power plant, in Cubatão. In 1956 an underground plant was added, increasing the power output to 880 Megawatts.

== See also ==
- 2015 Brazilian drought
