= Asa White Kenney Billings =

American hydroelectric engineer and pioneer of electrification

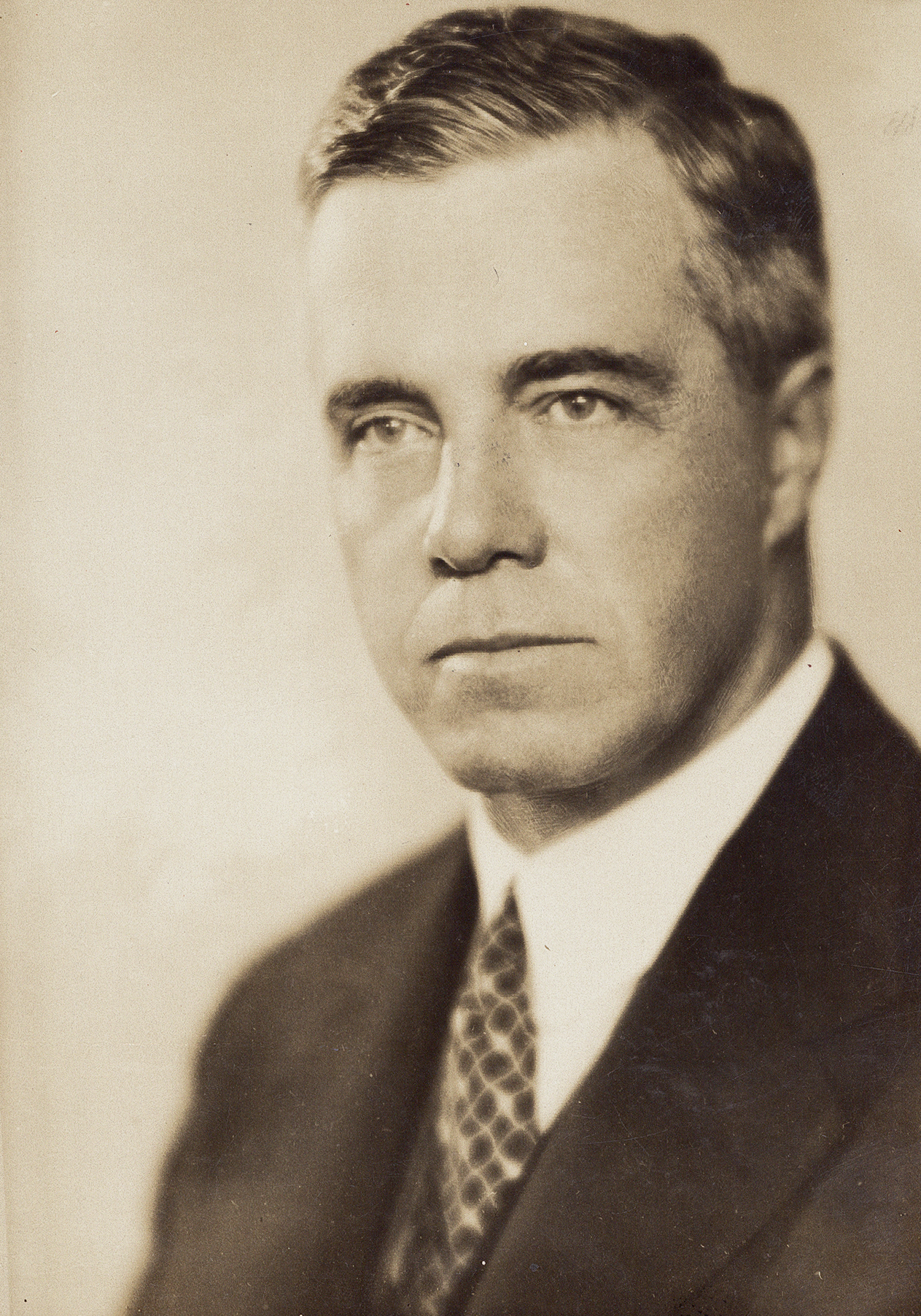
Asa White Kenney Billings.

Asa White Kenney Billings (February 8, 1876 – November 3, 1949) was an American hydroelectric engineer and a pioneer of the electrification of Brazil, where he spent nearly all of the last 27 years of his life. He is best remembered today for the Represa Billings (Billings Reservoir), the largest urban reservoir in São Paulo, which he played a large role in creating and bears his name.

Born to Albert Stearns Billings and Abbie Althea Billings (née Park) in Omaha, Nebraska, Asa Billings attended Omaha High School. He began working part-time at the local electrical plant at the age of 14. He attended Harvard University where he received a bachelor's degree in 1895 and a master's degree in 1896. He was awarded a Bowdoin prize and $100 (about $3100 in 2020, when adjusted for inflation) for his senior class dissertation. He married Edna Peabody in New York City on December 17, 1900, and their son Asa White Kenney Billings Jr. was born on September 20, 1901. Later in life he was married to Josephine J. Billings, and other children included Mary Warner and John J.

After graduating, he worked on electrical projects in many different locations around the world, including Pittsburgh and Cuba. He worked for Frederick Stark Pearson on projects in Texas and the Catalan Pyrenees, in the Barcelona Traction project. Upon the entry of the United States into World War I, he joined the civil engineering corps of the US Navy, and for his services received the Navy Cross for "supervision of construction work of naval air stations in Europe", and the chevalier rank of the Légion d'honneur.

In February 1922 he arrived in Brazil, where he would spend all but the last few months of the rest of his life. He worked for the "Light" company (Brazilian Traction, Light and Power Company, later known as Brascan), which operated the São Paulo Tramway, Light & Power Company, Ltd. and Rio de Janeiro Tramway, Light & Power Company, Ltd., and set to work creating hydroelectric power projects for the benefit of São Paulo and Rio de Janeiro. After some initial projects, in 1927 he planned and oversaw the construction of a dam across the Rio Grande (today known as the Rio Pinheiros) in São Paulo. Completed between 1935 and 1937, it created the 127 km^{2} reservoir (Represa Billings) that today bears his name. He continued to work on subsequent phases of this and similar hydroelectric projects, continually adding to the hydroelectric power capacity of both São Paulo and Rio de Janeiro. In 1944 he became president of the "Light" company, and retired in 1946.

He received an honorary electrical engineering degree from Tufts University in 1929. In 1936, he was invited to give a lecture to the Institution of Civil Engineers in London on "Water-Power in Brazil", which was published and used for teaching purposes. In 1947, he became an honorary member of the American Society of Civil Engineers. In 1946, he was awarded the commander (comendador) rank of the Order of the Southern Cross, the highest civilian award given to foreigners by Brazil.

On May 12, 1949, during a ceremony which he attended, the Represa Rio Grande was renamed Represa Billings in his honor. Soon after, he left Brazil for La Jolla, California, where he died a few months later in November 1949.

The Avenida Engenheiro Billings ("Engineer Billings Avenue") in central São Paulo is named for him.

== Bibliography ==
- Ackerman, Adolph J. (1953). Billings and Water Power in Brazil: A short biography of Asa White Kenney Billings, hydroelectric engineer. American Society of Civil Engineers.
