= Diadema, São Paulo =

Diadema
- Municipality
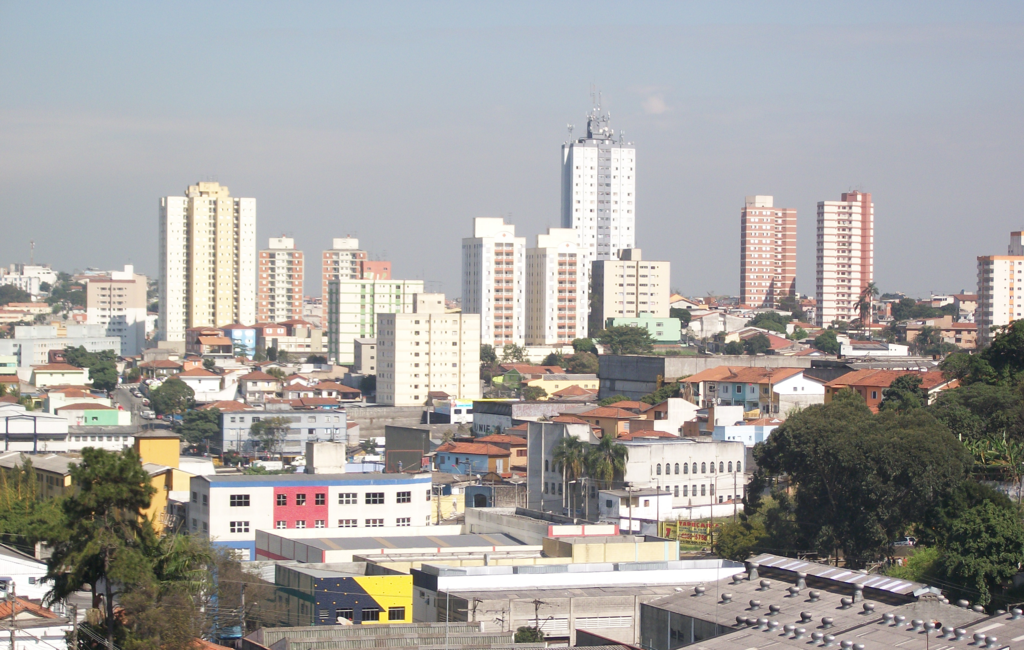
- Motto: Floreat, Diadema (Latin); Blossom, Diadema

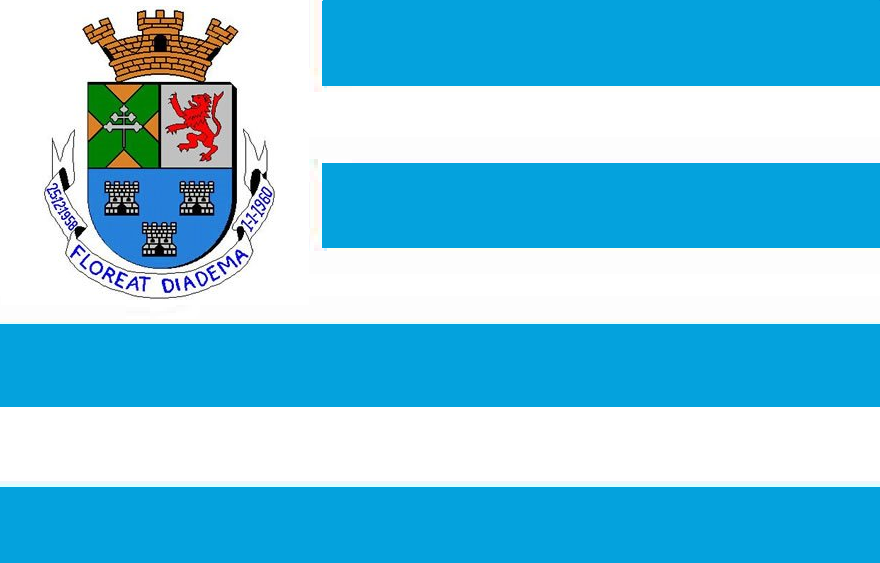
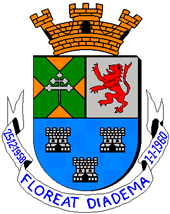
- Flag Coat of arms

- Location in São Paulo state

- Location in Brazil
- Coordinates: 23°41′10″S 46°36′38″W
- Country: Brazil
- Region: Southeast
- State: São Paulo
- Founded: December 8, 1960

Government
  - Mayor: Taka Yamauchi (MDB)

Area
  - Total: 30.73 km^{2} (11.86 sq mi)
- Elevation: 780 m (2,560 ft)

Population (2022)
  - Total: 393,237
  - Estimate (2025): 403,579
  - Density: 12,800/km^{2} (33,140/sq mi)
- Time zone: UTC−3 (BRT)
- Website: www.diadema.sp.gov.br

Diadema (Portuguese pronunciation: [dʒi.ɐˈdemɐ], Diadem) is a municipality in São Paulo state, Brazil. Belonging to the ABCD Region of Greater São Paulo, it is 17 km (11 mi) distant from São Paulo's central point. Initially part of São Bernardo do Campo, Diadema became a city of its own in 1959. The population is 393,237 in an area of 30.73 km^{2} (11.86 mi^{2}). The annual mean temperature in the city is 19.6 °C (67.3 °F). Its HDI is 0.790.

Historical population
Year	Pop.	±%
1970	78,914	—
1980	228,663	+189.8%
1991	305,287	+33.5%
2000	357,064	+17.0%
2010	386,089	+8.1%
2022	393,237	+1.9%

Although located in the heart of a traditionally industrial region, its main source of income is the service sector, featuring 77 healthcare installations. Diadema is home to a butterfly zoo, a botanical garden, an art museum and an observatory.

== History ==
Since its beginning, Diadema occupation process had one fundamental factor: its geographical location between the coast – Vila de São Vicente – and the plateau – Vila de São Paulo de Piratininga (São Paulo city early name). It was the existence of a connecting road between São Bernardo do Campo and Santo Amaro that provided ways for the early inhabitants to arrive to the neighborhoods in the early 18th century. The avenues that are now known as Antonio Piranga and Piraporinha were originated from this early roads.

Until the 1940s, Diadema was constituted by four neighborhoods belonging to São Bernardo do Campo: Piraporinha, Eldorado, Taboão e Vila Conceição. Dispersed, they were only connected through roads of difficult passage and each neighborhood had its own life. Piraporinha near São Bernardo; Taboão, also connected to São Bernardo do Campo due to the proximity and to São Paulo through Água Funda Avenue. Eldorado, a neighborhood that had unique characteristics, because of the Billings Reservoir, had a greater proximity to São Paulo, to the Santo Amaro region and finally Vila Conceição formed by the farms that once belonged to the Vila Conceição Company.

With the village came progress, which began in 1900 with the construction of a steam-powered sawmill owned by Antônio Piranga, son of José Pedroso. At the beginning of the 20th century, the old cattle route (Estrada da Vila Conceição) began to undergo a process of industrialization and urbanization. The steam-powered sawmill operated for twenty years (until 1920), supplying a furniture-making industry in São Bernardo do Campo.

== Education ==
The municipality has several higher education facilities: a campus of the Instituto Nacional de Estudos e Pesquisas Educacionais Anísio Teixeira, a branch of the São Paulo State Technological College, and a Serviço Nacional de Aprendizagem Industrial regional department.

The campus of the Universidade Federal de São Paulo, founded in 2007, provides degrees in chemistry, chemical engineering, pharmacy, and biology. Since 2009 an industrial chemistry degree was added and in 2010 a further two courses; in environmental sciences and a science licentiate degree (a combination of physics, mathematics, biology and chemistry).

== Media ==
In telecommunications, the city was served by Companhia Telefônica da Borda do Campo. In July 1998, this company was acquired by Telefónica, which adopted the Vivo brand in 2012. The company is currently an operator of cell phones, fixed lines, internet (fiber optics/4G) and television (satellite and cable).

== Sport ==
EC Água Santa is the local association football club.

== Notable people ==
- David Luiz, professional footballer who plays as a defender for Fortaleza. He previously played for the likes of Chelsea, Arsenal, PSG, Benfica and Flamengo. He is a former Brazil international, playing in the 2014 FIFA World Cup and winning the 2013 FIFA Confederations Cup.
- Denílson, retired footballer who played as a left winger. He played mainly for São Paulo and Real Betis, who made him the world's most expensive player in 1998. He also played in two FIFA World Cup editions with Brazil, winning the tournament in 2002.
- John, professional footballer who plays as a goalkeeper for Nottingham Forest. He is a 2024 Copa Libertadores champion.
- Washington Silva, boxer, South American champion

== See also ==
- Santos FC
- Wtorre
- List of municipalities in São Paulo
