= Light Serviços de Eletricidade =

Brazilian electric company

Light Serviços de Eletricidade S.A.
- Company type: Sociedade Anônima
- Industry: Electricity
- Headquarters: Rio de Janeiro, Brazil
- Products: Electrical power
- Services: Electricity distribution
- Parent: Rio Minas Energia Participações S.A.
- Website: www.light.com.br

Light Serviços de Eletricidade S.A. is an electric company based in Rio de Janeiro, Brazil. It is controlled by Rio Minas Energia Participações S.A.

The company was privatized by the Brazilian federal government in 1996 when it was bought by a consortium of Houston Industries, AES Corp, and Électricité de France for US$1.7 billion. In 2006, 78.4% stake was bought by Rio Minas Energia Participações S.A.

== History ==
Electrical power infrastructure in Rio de Janeiro was originally developed in the first half of the 20th century by the Rio de Janeiro Tramway, Light and Power Company, a company financed with foreign capital and legally domiciled in Toronto, Canada. After 1912, this company was part of the holding company Brazilian Traction, Light and Power Company (usually known in Brazil simply as "Light"), which eventually changed its name to Brascan (for "Brasil" + "Canada"). In 1979, the company's Brazilian assets transferred to Brazilian ownership. The Canadian company, which had in the meantime diversified to other areas, still exists under the name Brookfield Asset Management.
