= Paranapiacaba =

- District
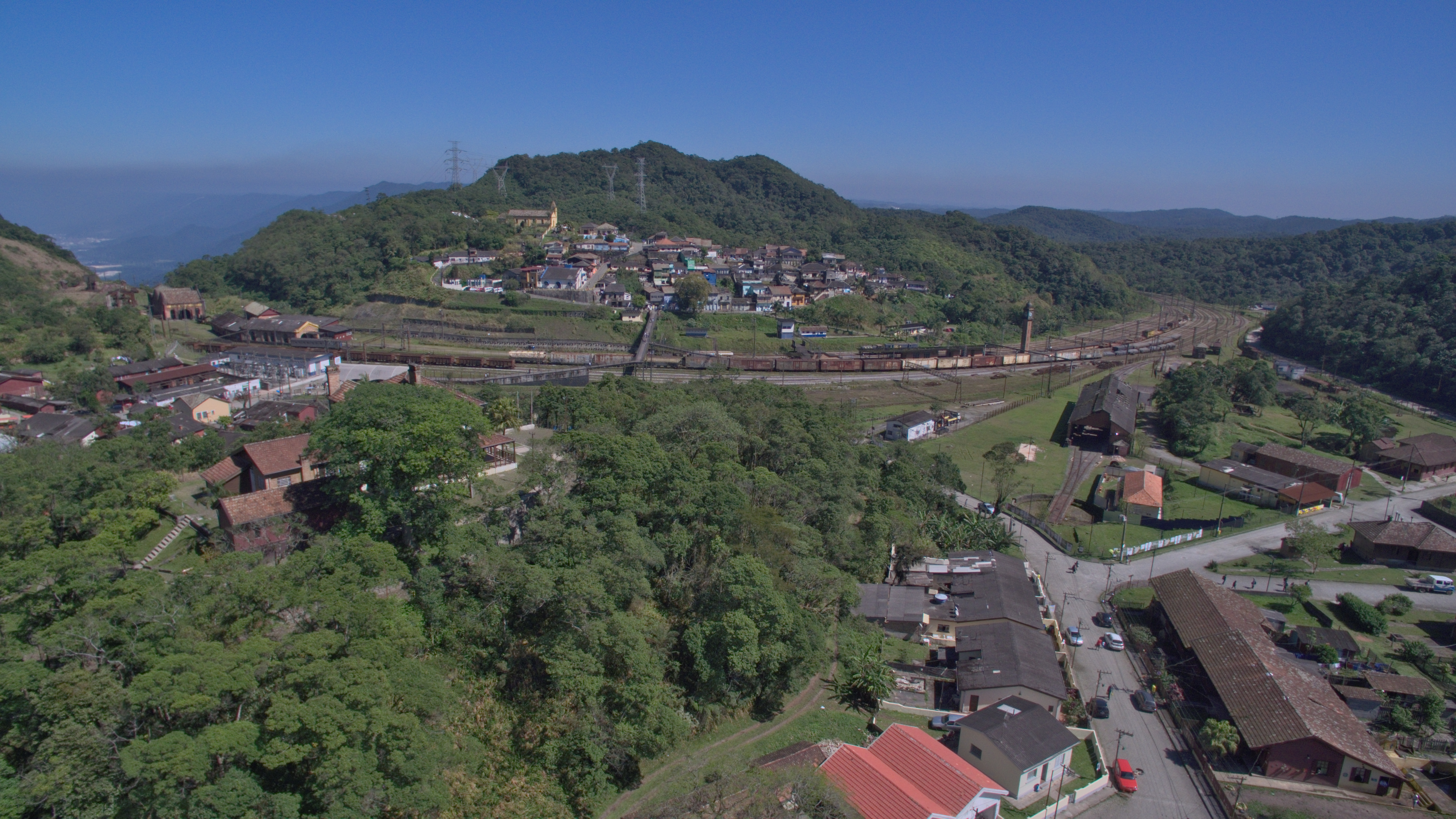
- A view of Paranapiacaba village, in Santo André, Brazil.
- Interactive map of Paranapiacaba
- Coordinates: 23°46′40″S 46°18′05″W
- Country: Brazil
- State: São Paulo

Area
  - Total: 84.464 km^{2} (32.612 sq mi)

Population (2022)
  - Total: 2,458
  - Density: 29.10/km^{2} (75.37/sq mi)
- Time zone: UTC-3

Paranapiacaba is a district of the municipality of Santo André in the Brazilian state of São Paulo. It is located approximately 61 kilometres (38 mi) by road southeast of the centre of the city of São Paulo, and about 12 kilometres (7.5 mi) east of Rio Grande da Serra. The word paranapiacaba means "where you will find the sea" in Tupi.

Paranapiacaba was established as a company town for the employees of São Paulo Railway, a privately owned British railway company. A large industrial complex, which the district is known for, lies off the main road from Rio Grande da Serra, on the way into the main village. The growth of this centre was facilitated by the railway, transporting cargo and people from São Paulo Interior to the port of Santos. The village design has been characterized as being panoptic.

== Geography ==
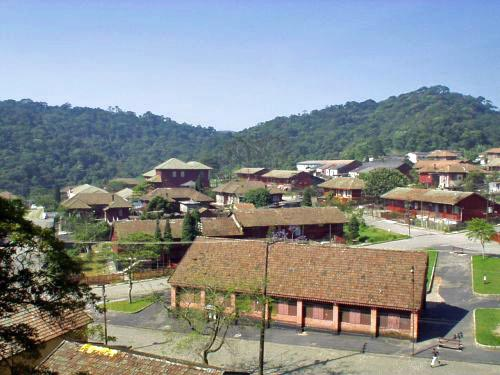
View of the houses of Paranapiacaba

The village is located on a slope opposite Santo André, approximately 61 kilometres (38 mi) by road southeast of the centre of the city of São Paulo, and about 12 kilometres (7.5 mi) east of Rio Grande da Serra. The industrial complex, larger than the village itself, however, lies just several kilometres to the southeast of Rio Grande da Serra. The village is located amidst the Serra do Mar coastal forests, in the south coast, at the highest point of the area, and hence it came to be known as “a place to view the sea” in Tupi-Guarani language. The Mata Atlantica around the town provides ample opportunities for hiking into the forest of the Parque Estadual da Serra do Mar where orchids and bromelias are major attractions. Agriculture and grazing farms are situated to the west while the nearby mountains reach elevations of 700–930 metres (2,300–3,050 ft).

Rail connections can be made to Paranapiacaba from Estação da Luz, one of the four stations in São Paulo. The nearest international airport is the Cumbica at Guarulhos, outside São Paulo. MRS Logística used electric traction between Paranapiacaba and Raiz de Serra.

== History ==
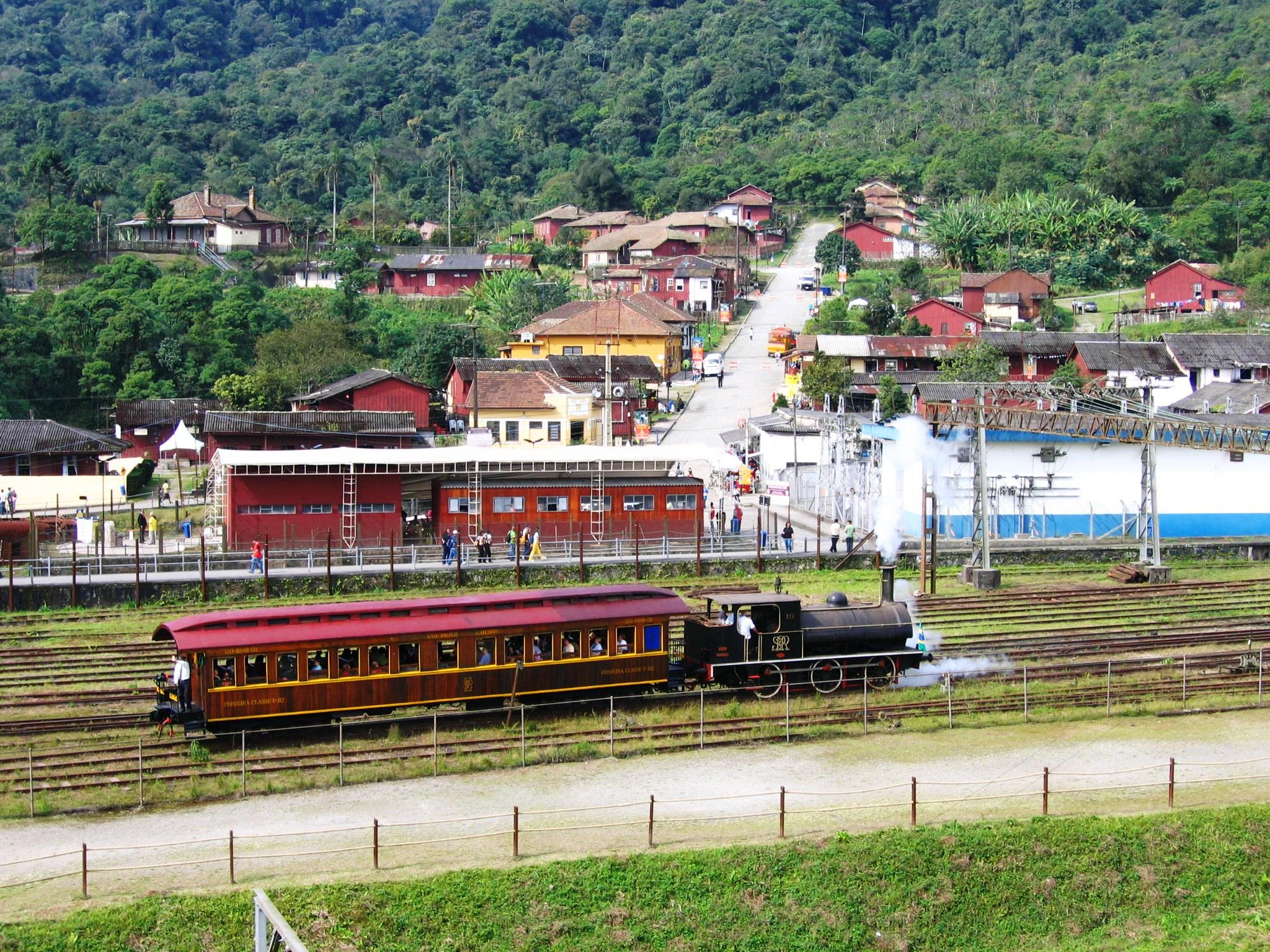
Locomotives of Paranapiacaba

Vila de Paranapiacaba was established during the middle of the 19th century; it was designed according to the prison model style developed by Jeremy Bentham. It was founded by the British-owned São Paulo Railway Company. The construction of this zig-zag railway line in the hilly local terrain was considered a feat by the British engineers and workers at the time. The town was built when the company built the railway line to export coffee beans from the area through the port of Santos. The village prospered for 30 years, until automated machinery replaced the funicular, which was labor-intensive. The village's population suddenly declined and many of its buildings were abandoned. At one time, there were 4,000 workers, most of them British citizens. The last steam train in Paranapiacaba was deactivated in 1982.

== City design ==
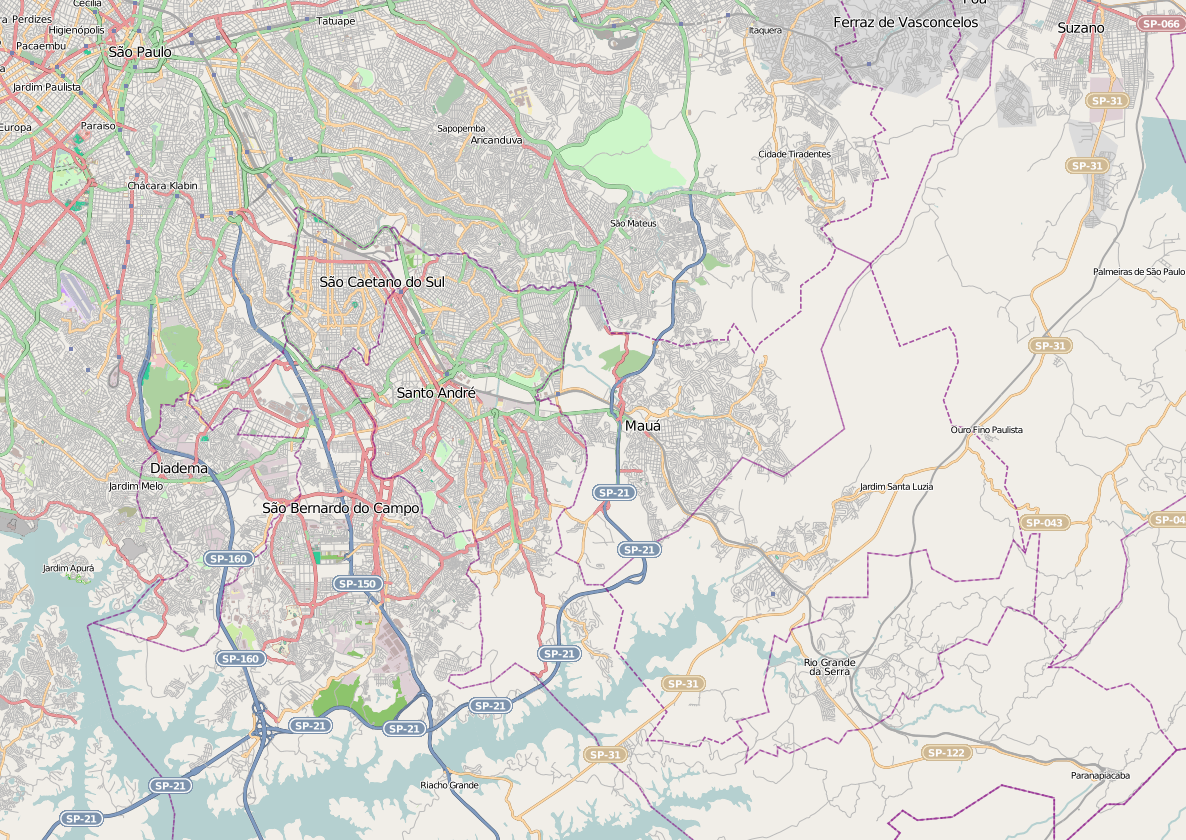
Map

Paranapiacaba was designed in a special model style. Because of its remoteness, the town has been well preserved. The buildings were all of English style (even the large homes were of Victorian style) built with wood and bricks. The houses in the town are all made of timber and looks like a mofussil area of Surrey. The town was laid out in the 1890s in a grid pattern. Even though Brazil attained independence in 1822, its architectural styles were influenced by Portuguese colonizers and by the British. The town is stated as having more English architecture than perhaps anywhere else in the country.

== Notable landmarks ==
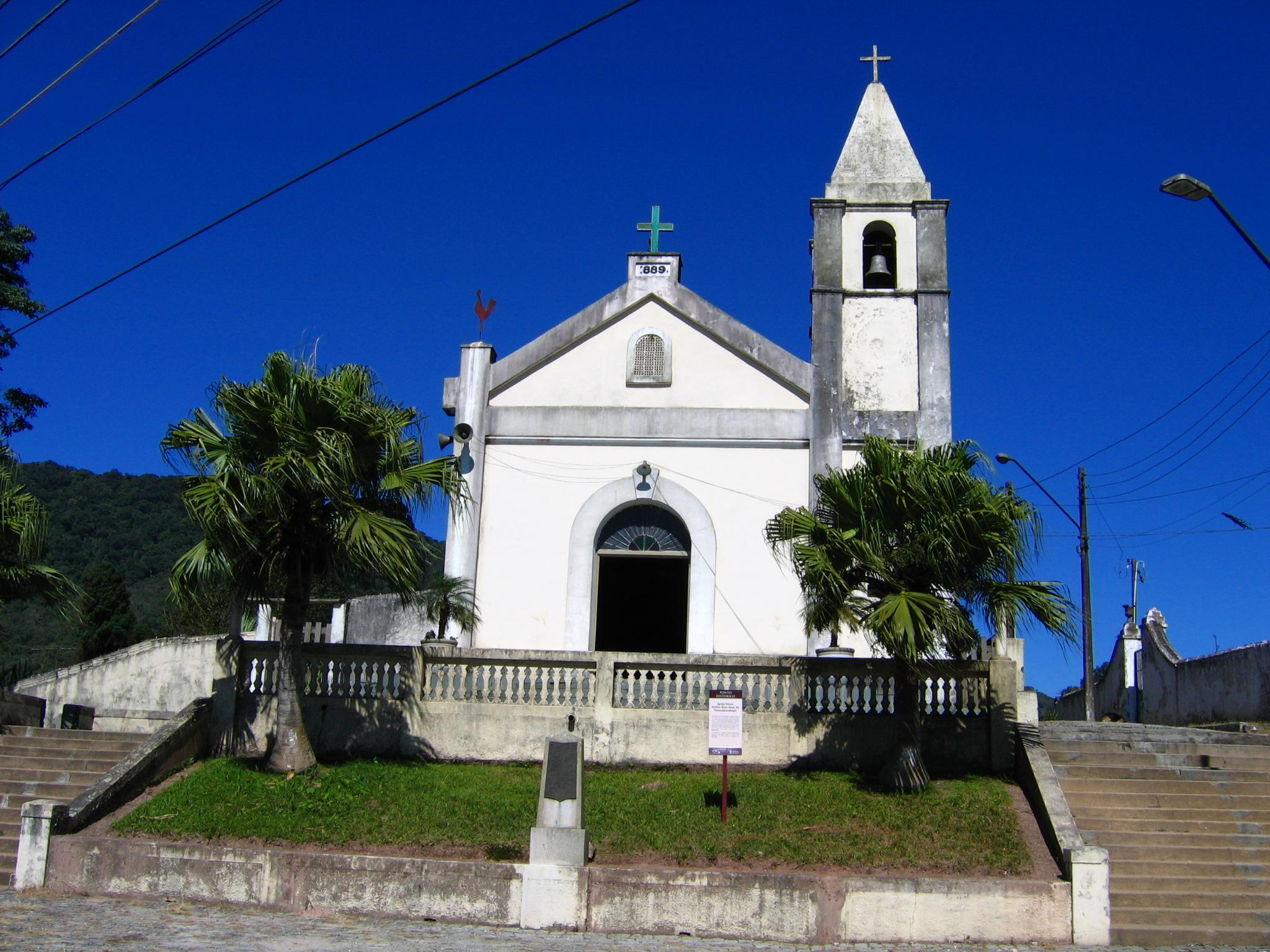
Igreja matriz de Paranapiacaba

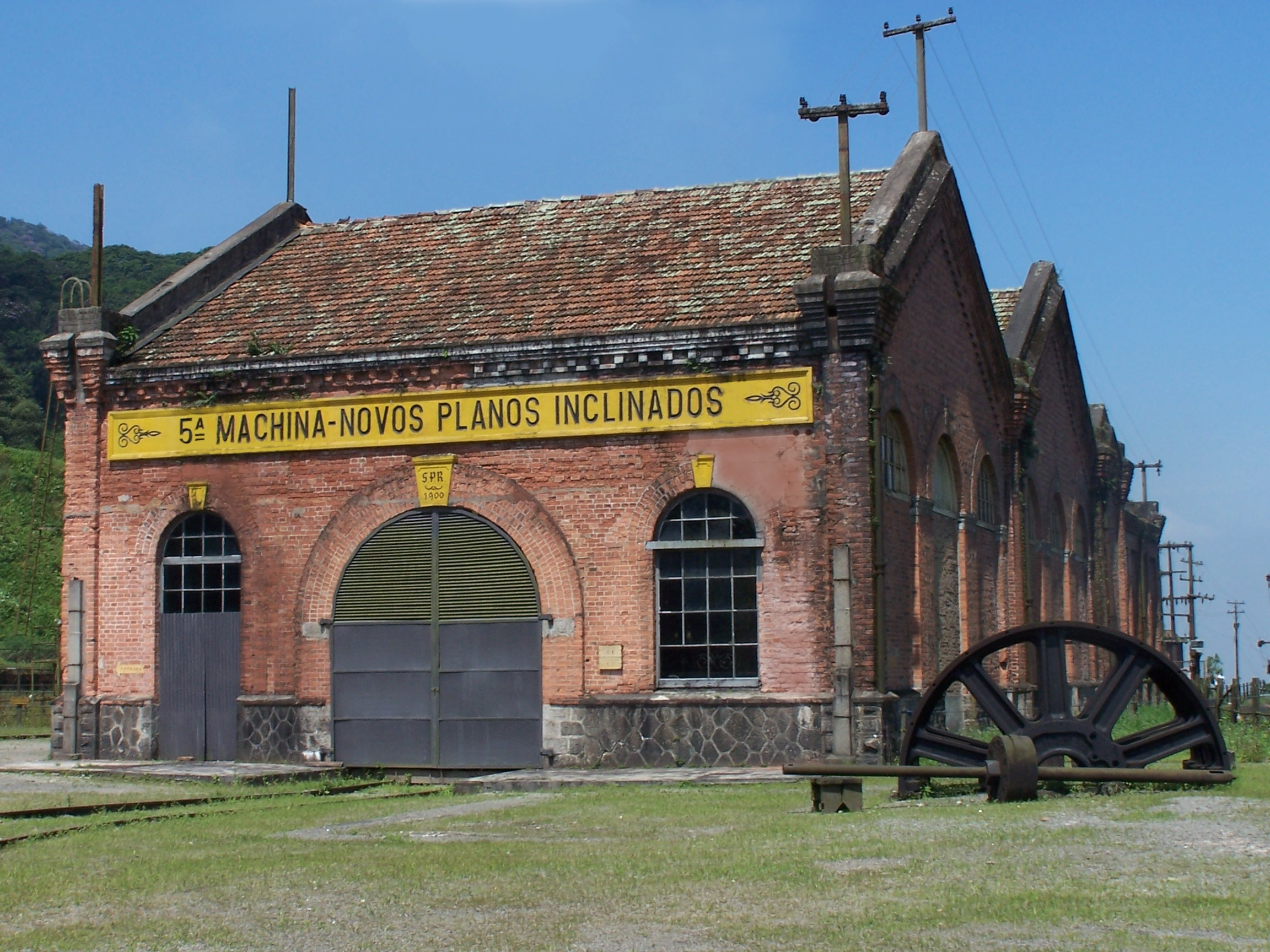
The Funicular de Paranapiacaba museum

The District of Paranapiacaba is known for its large industrial complex, which lies off the main road from Rio Grande da Serra, on the way into the main village, but is actually nearer Rio Grande da Serra. The growth of this industrial centre was facilitated by the railway, transporting goods to the port of Santos. The railway station's clock tower is based on Big Ben in London. The locomotive stations, old British carriages and steam engines, cable station (funicular type), and workers' cottages are all well preserved and form part of the museum which is open to the public.

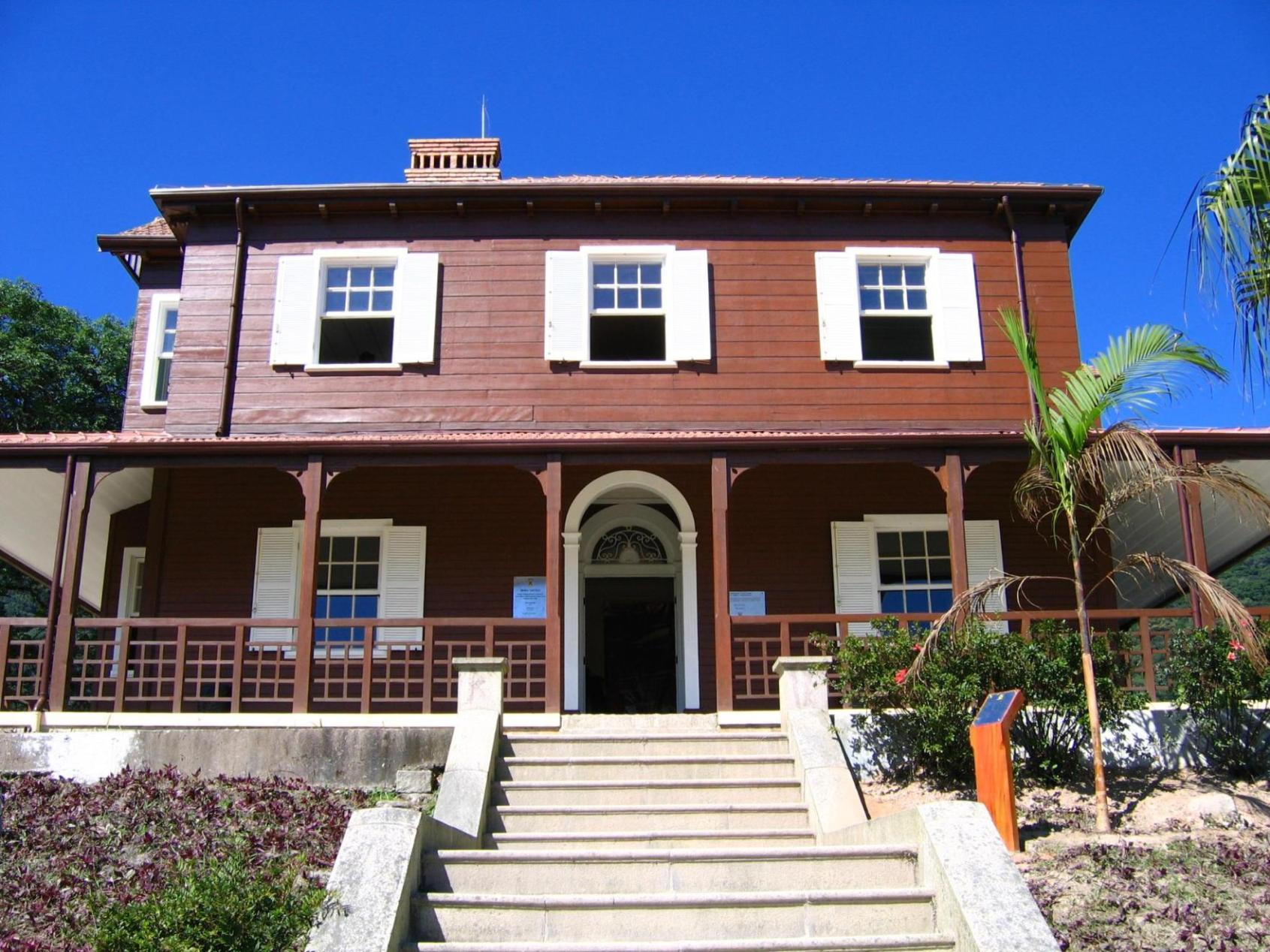
Castilino

On the hill top above the village is the old Victorian style Castilino, once the residence of the Chief Engineer of the Railways, which is now a museum known as the Centro Preservacao da Historia de Paranpiacaba, where old railway line maps and photographs are displayed. The museum has elegant furnishings and provides views of its surroundings. In the 1980s, a working steam engine from the turn of the 20th century ran several times a day, originally used to pull inclined trains from the coast. Visitors can view the working parts and watch them while the engine is running. Recivitas (Instituto pela Revitalização da Cidadania) created a free toy center and library here. The Funicular de Paranapiacaba railway museum was established in 1970, and today is one of the biggest attractions in the district. The Clube União Lira Serrano is also of note, and was founded in 1930 as a social club for the railway operators. The parish church, Capela do Alto da Serra or Igreja matriz de Paranapiacaba, opened for the first time on August 8, 1884.

== Preservation ==
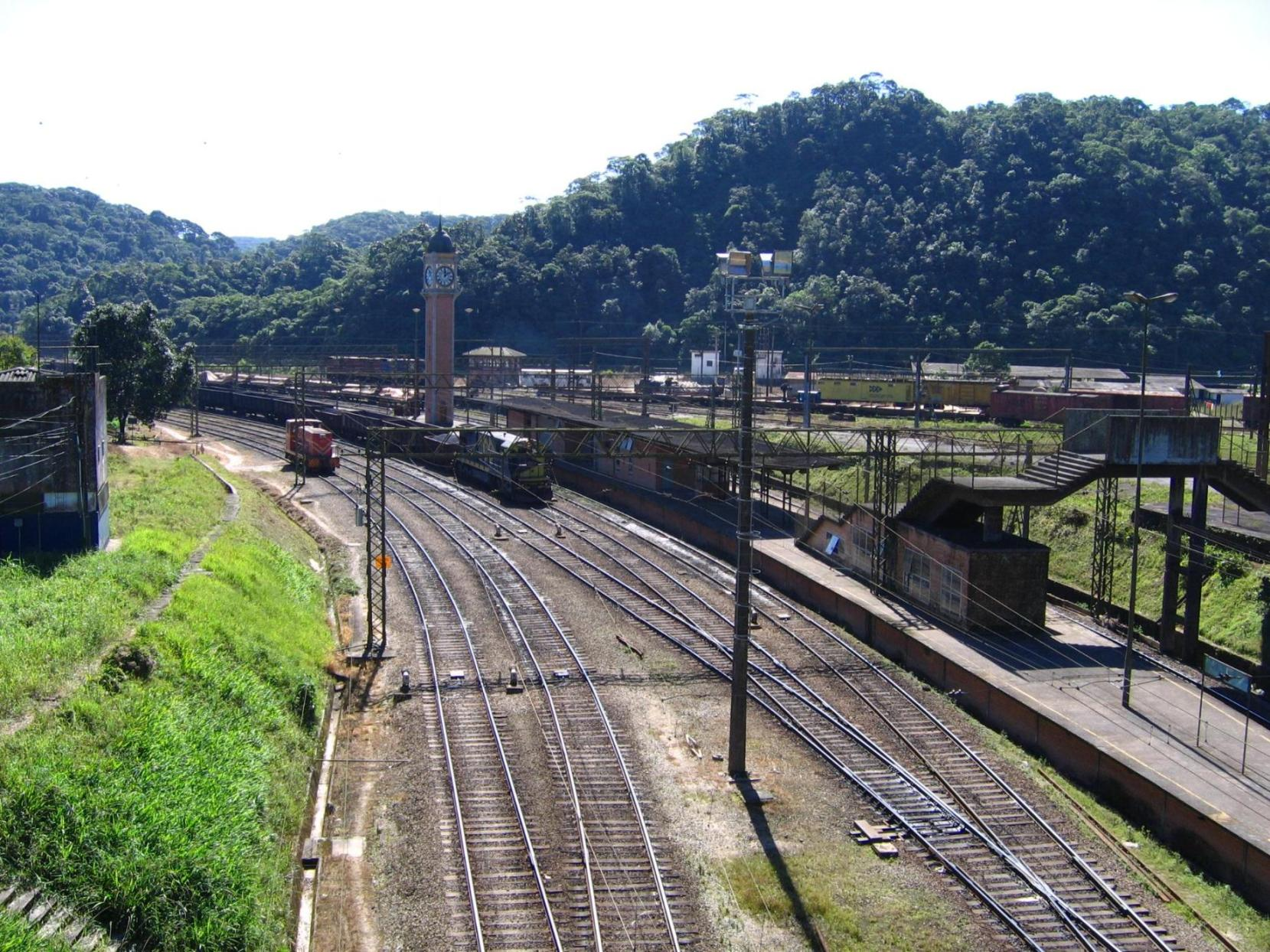
Railway and clock tower

In order to preserve the heritage status of Paranapiacaba as a well-preserved railway town, the government of Brazil decreed it to be a historic district and initiated further steps to preserve its heritage status and encourage its development as a suburb of São Paulo and to promote tourism. The objective of this project is to preserve the natural, cultural, and industrial heritage and ensure economic progress of the town in particular and the region as a whole.

The site was included in the 2000 and 2002 World Monuments Watch (WMW) by the World Monuments Fund, calling for investments to revitalize the village. With funding from American Express the Fund helped local stakeholders implement this effort. By 2008, the conservation efforts of the WMW team were successful in restoring Casa Fox (the Archive), the Castelinho (now a museum), the Lyra Serrano Club, and the Old Market. Further restoration works are continuing. The town has witnessed a dramatic change in its environment with much improved facilities also resulting in economic progress of the area.
