= Ribeirão Pires =

- Municipality
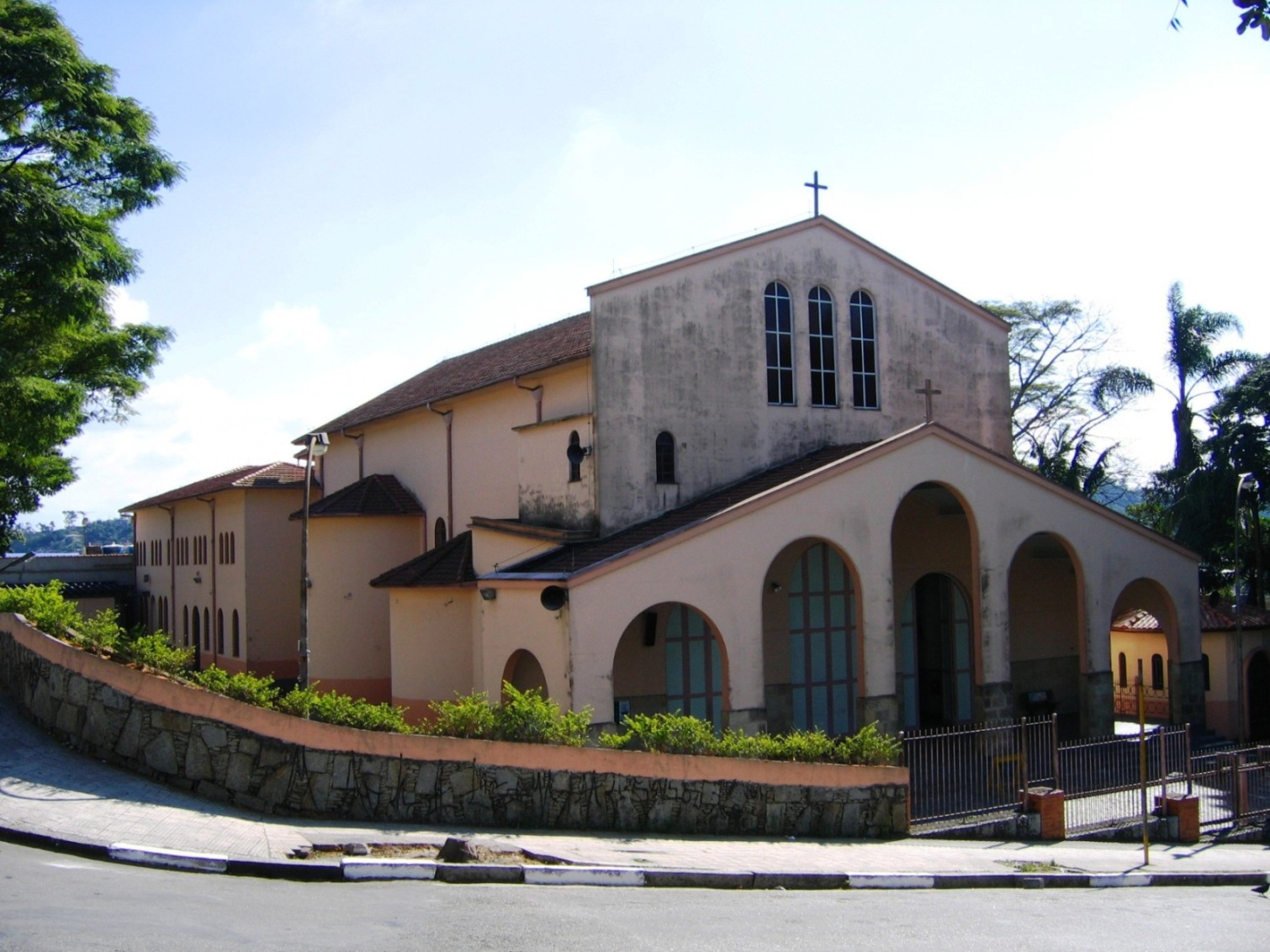
- First church of Ribeirão Pires

- Flag Coat of arms

- Location in São Paulo state

- Location in Brazil
- Coordinates: 23°42′55″S 46°25′10″W
- Country: Brazil
- Region: Southeast
- State: São Paulo

Government
  - Mayor: Guto Volpi (PL)

Area
  - Total: 98,972 km^{2} (38,213 sq mi)
- Elevation: 800 m (2,600 ft)

Population (2022 Census)
  - Total: 115,559
  - Estimate (2025): 118,954
  - Density: 1.1676/km^{2} (3.0241/sq mi)
- Time zone: UTC−3 (BRT)
- Website: www.ribeiraopires.sp.gov.br

Ribeirão Pires (Pires Stream) is a city in the Metropolitan Region of the city of São Paulo, in the state of São Paulo, Brazil. It is part of the "ABC Region” of Greater São Paulo. The population is 115,559 (2022 Census) in an area of 99.1 km^{2}. The elevation is 763 m.

Its neighboring cities are Ferraz de Vasconcelos to the north, Suzano to the northeast and east, Rio Grande da Serra to the southeast and south, Santo André southwest, and Mauá northwest. The city is served by trains from Line 10 of CPTM. It became its own municipality in 1953, following its emancipation from Santo André.

== Media ==
In telecommunications, the city was served by Companhia Telefônica da Borda do Campo. In July 1998, this company was acquired by Telefónica, which adopted the Vivo brand in 2012. The company is currently an operator of cell phones, fixed lines, internet (fiber optics/4G) and television (satellite and cable).

== Notable people ==
- Willian
- Paulo Szot

== See also ==
- List of municipalities in São Paulo
