= Latin America =

Region of the Americas

- Location in the Americas
- Area: 20,056,965 km^{2} (7,744,037 sq mi)
- Population: ▲656,098,097 (2021 est.) (Note: Includes the population estimates for South American and Central American countries excluding Belize, Guyana, the United States, and Spanish, French and French Creole-speaking Caribbean countries and territories, as listed under "Subregions and countries") (3rd by political entity) (4th by continent)
- Population density: 31/km^{2} (80/sq mi)
- GDP (PPP): Total: ▲$14.071 trillion (2024) (4th); Per capita: ▲$21,684 (2024) (63rd)
- GDP (nominal): Total: ▲$6.7 trillion (2024) (4th); Per capita: ▲$10,042 (2024) (81st)
- Ethnic groups: 40% Mixed Indigenous Amerindian and European heritage (Mestizo); 29% European heritage (White Latin Americans); 19% Mixed African and European heritage (Mulatto); 6% Indigenous peoples of the Americas; 5% Afro–Latin Americans; 1% Asian Latin Americans; (2018)
- Demonym: Latin American
- Countries: 20 (Note: Not including non-sovereign states (except Puerto Rico) and English-, Haitian Creole-, or Dutch-speaking countries, such as the Bahamas, Belize, Guyana, Haiti, Jamaica, Suriname, and Trinidad and Tobago; see Modern definitions section): Argentina; Bolivia; Brazil; Chile; Colombia; Costa Rica; Cuba; Dominican Republic; Ecuador; El Salvador; Guatemala; Honduras; Mexico; Nicaragua; Panama; Paraguay; Peru; Puerto Rico (Note: Territory of the United States.); Uruguay; Venezuela
- Languages: 96.9% Indo-European; 95% Romance; 60% Spanish (Castilian); 33% Portuguese; 1% French and Haitian Creole; 1% Italo-Dalmatian; 0.05% Papiamento; 1.5% Germanic; 1% English and creoles; 0.45% German; 0.07% Dutch; 0.4% Indo-Iranian; 0.4% Caribbean Hindustani; 1% Quechuan; 1% Tupian; 1% Guarani; 0.90% Mayan; 0.55% Eastern; 0.45% Quichean; 0.09% Mamean; 0.25% Western; 0.19% Cholan–Tzeltalan; 0.06% Qʼanjobalan; 0.10% Yucatec; 0.40% Aymaran; 0.30% Uto-Aztecan; 0.25% Nahuatl; 0.30% Oto-Manguean; 0.06% Arawakan; 0.06% Chibchan; 0.06% Japanese; 0.03% Araucanian
- Time zones: UTC−02:00 (Brazil) to UTC−08:00 (Mexico)
- Internet TLD: .lat
- UN M49 codes: 419 – Latin America and the Caribbean; 019 – Americas; 001 – World

Latin America (Spanish: América Latina or Latinoamérica; Portuguese: América Latina) is the cultural region of the Americas where Romance languages are predominantly spoken, primarily Spanish and Portuguese. (Note: To a lesser extent, some definitions include French and its creoles (e.g. Haitian), as well as Italian dialects.)

Since it is defined according to its cultural identity instead of its geography, Latin America includes countries from both North and South America. For instance, countries from North America like Mexico, Honduras, Guatemala, etc. tend to be included. In fact, most of the countries in Central America, South America and the Caribbean are considered Latin American countries. English or Dutch-speaking countries in South America or the Caribbean like Belize, Guyana, Jamaica, Trinidad and Tobago, Suriname, etc. are not considered "Latin American" because they speak Germanic languages. As such, Latin America comprises Hispanic America along with Brazil. Related terms include the narrower Hispanic America, which exclusively refers to Spanish-speaking nations; and the broader Ibero-America, which includes all Iberian countries in the Americas.

The term Latin America was first introduced in 1856 at a conference named Initiative of the Americas: Idea for a Federal Congress of the Republics (Iniciativa de la América. Idea de un Congreso Federal de las Repúblicas), at Paris. (Note: The original Spanish uses the singular form, la América, equivalent to meaning conveyed in English by the plural form, "the Americas".) Chilean politician Francisco Bilbao coined the term to refer to countries sharing cultural and linguistic heritage. It gained further prominence during the 1860s under the rule of Napoleon III, whose government sought to justify France's intervention in the Second Mexican Empire.

== Etymology and definitions ==
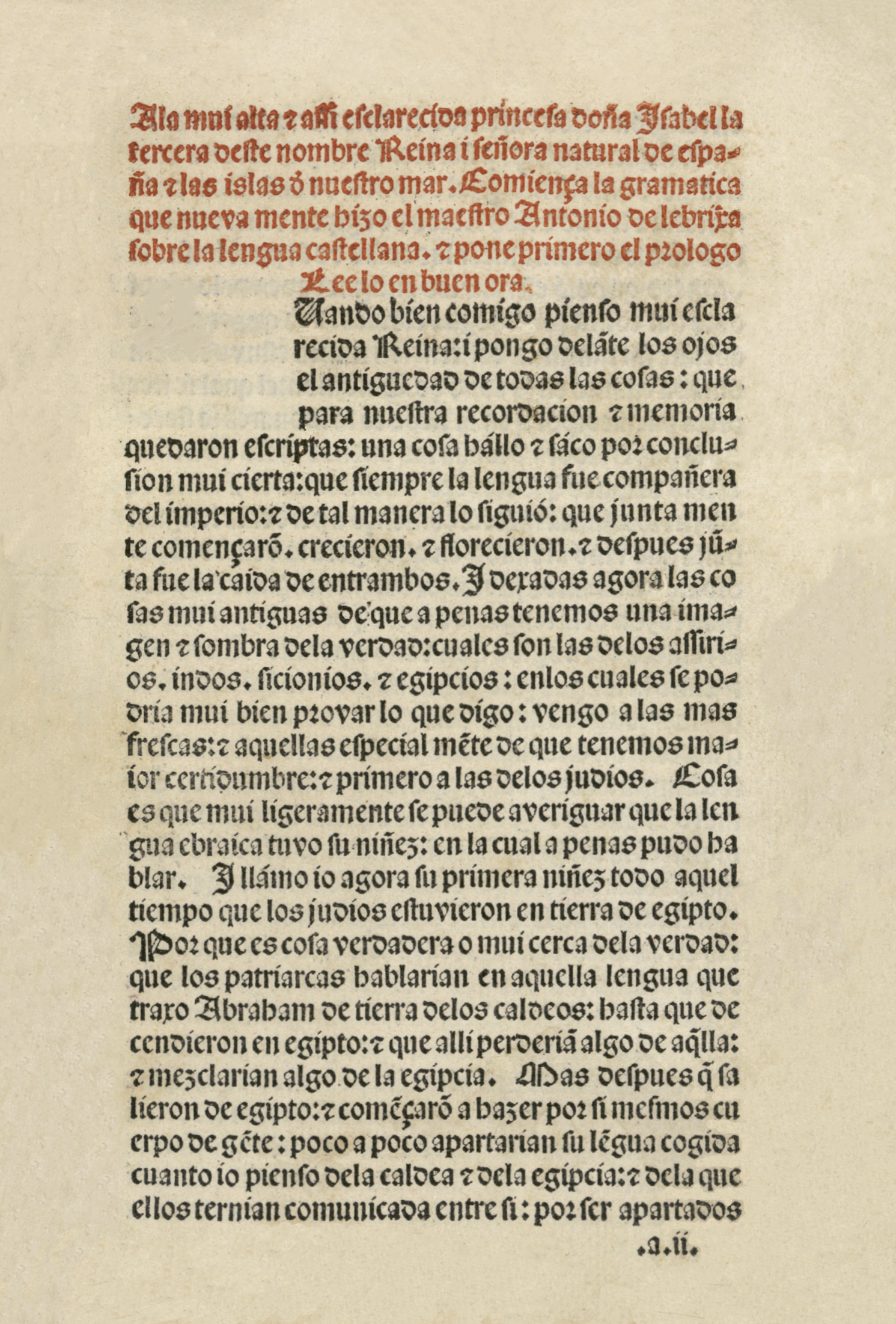
The first page of Nebrija's Gramática de la lengua castellana in 1492.

Latin America is a geographical region where Spanish or Portuguese is the national language with a common culture, and tradition. As a whole, it can be traced back to the 1830s, in the writing of the French Saint-Simonian Michel Chevalier, who postulated that a part of the Americas was inhabited by people of a "Latin race", and that it could, therefore, ally itself with "Latin Europe", ultimately overlapping the Latin Church, in a struggle with "Teutonic Europe" and "Anglo-Saxon America" with its Anglo-Saxonism, as well as "Slavic Europe" with its Pan-Slavism.

Published in 1492, Gramática de la lengua castellana (lit. 'Grammar of the Castilian Language') written by Antonio de Nebrija was the first work dedicated to the Spanish language and its rules, and it was the first grammar of a modern European language to be published.

Uruguayan historian Arturo Ardao and Chilean historian Miguel Rojas Mix found evidence that the term "Latin America" was used earlier than John Leddy Phelan had claimed, and that the first use of the term was in opposition to imperialist projects in the Americas. Ardao wrote about this subject in his book Génesis de la idea y el nombre de América latina (Genesis of the Idea and the Name of Latin America, 1980), and Miguel Rojas Mix in his article "Bilbao y el hallazgo de América latina: Unión continental, socialista y libertaria" (Bilbao and the Finding of Latin America: a Continental, Socialist, and Libertarian Union, 1986).

Michel Gobat notes that "Arturo Ardao, Miguel Rojas Mix, and Aims McGuinness have revealed [that] the term 'Latin America' had already been used in 1856 by Central Americans and South Americans protesting US expansion into the Southern Hemisphere". Edward Shawcross summarizes Ardao's and Rojas Mix's findings: "Ardao identified the term in a poem by a Colombian diplomat and intellectual resident in France, José María Torres Caicedo, published on 15 February 1857 in a French-based Spanish-language newspaper, while Rojas Mix located it in a speech delivered in France by the radical liberal Chilean politician Francisco Bilbao in June 1856".

By the late 1850s, the term was being used in California (by then a part of the United States), with local newspapers such as El Clamor Público writing about América latina and latinoamérica, and identifying as Latinos as the abbreviated term for their "hemispheric membership in la raza latina".

The words "Latin" and "America" were first found to be combined in a printed work to produce the term "Latin America" in 1856 at a conference by the Chilean politician Francisco Bilbao in Paris. The conference had the title "Initiative of the America. The idea for a Federal Congress of Republics." The following year, Colombian writer José María Torres Caicedo also used the term in his poem "The Two Americas".

Both authors advocated for the political and economic union of all Latin American countries, arguing that regional unity was the only effective means of defending their territories against further foreign interventions by the United States. They also rejected European imperialism, warning that the resurgence of non-democratic governments in Europe posed an additional threat to the stability and autonomy of Latin American nations. In criticizing European political developments, they employed the same term to characterize the deteriorating state of European governance at the time: "despotism".l c

Several years later, during the French invasion of Mexico, Bilbao wrote another work, "Emancipation of the Spirit in the Americas", where he asked all Latin American countries to support the Mexican cause against France, and rejected French imperialism in Asia, Africa, Europe and the Americas. He asked Latin American intellectuals to search for their "intellectual emancipation" by abandoning all French ideas, claiming that France was: "Hypocrite, because she [France] calls herself protector of the Latin race just to subject it to her exploitation regime; treacherous, because she speaks of freedom and nationality, when, unable to conquer freedom for herself, she enslaves others instead!" Therefore, as Michel Gobat puts it, the term Latin America itself had an "anti-imperial genesis," and their creators were far from supporting any form of imperialism in the region, or in any other place of the globe.

Following in the tradition of Chilean writer Francisco Bilbao, who excluded Brazil, Argentina and Paraguay from his early conceptualization of Latin America, Chilean historian Jaime Eyzaguirre has criticized the term Latin America for "disguising" and "diluting" the Spanish character of a region (i.e. Hispanic America) with the inclusion of nations that, according to him, do not share the same pattern of conquest and colonization. Historian Mauricio Tenorio-Trillo remarked, "the idea of 'Latin America' ought to have vanished with the obsolescence of racial theory."

=== Modern definitions ===
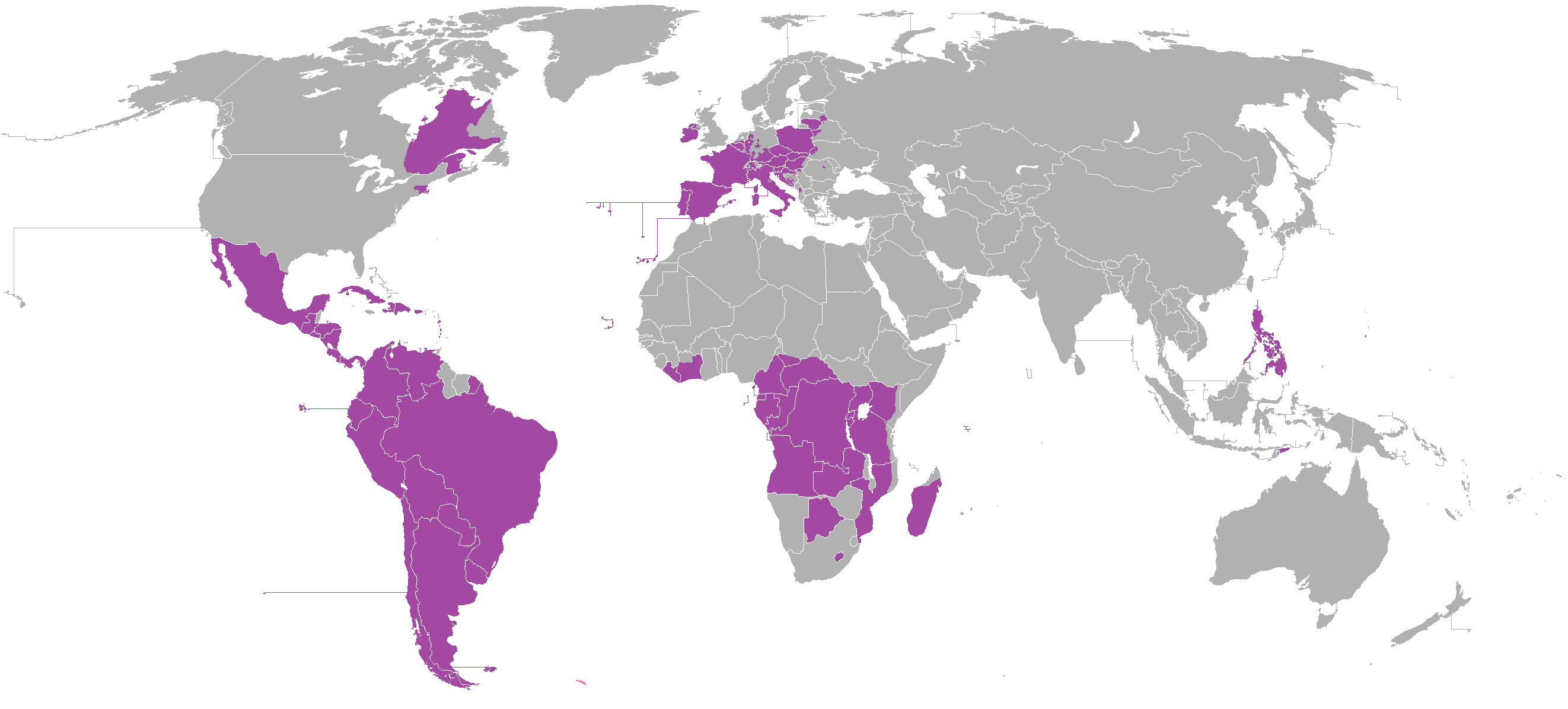
Areas of the world with a Catholic Christian majority. Latin America, like Latin Europe, is linked to the Latin Church.

- The most common definition of Latin America is the countries and territories in the Americas where the populations speak Spanish or Portuguese and the dominant religion is Roman Catholic, with it being synonymous with Ibero-America ("Iberian America"). Puerto Rico, the Spanish-speaking Caribbean territory of the United States, acquired from the Spanish Empire following its defeat in the 1898 Spanish–American War, is usually included. This definition excludes the predominantly Protestant English-speaking and Dutch-speaking regions, as well as French-speaking predominantly Catholic regions. Belize, Guyana and Suriname, as well as several French overseas departments, are excluded from the definition.
- In a less used definition, Latin America designates the set of countries in the Americas where any Romance language (a language derived from Latin) predominates: Spanish, Portuguese, or French. Thus, it includes Mexico; most of Central and South America; and in the Caribbean, Cuba, Puerto Rico, the Dominican Republic, and Haiti. French Guiana and the French West Indies are sometimes included. By this definition, Latin America then comprises all of the countries in the Americas that were once part of the Spanish, Portuguese, and French Empires.
- The term is sometimes used more broadly to refer to all of the Americas south of the United States, thus including the Guianas (French Guiana, Guyana, and Suriname); the Anglophone Caribbean (and Belize); the Francophone Caribbean; and the Dutch Caribbean. This definition emphasizes a similar socioeconomic history of the region, which was characterized by formal or informal colonialism, rather than cultural aspects (see, for example, dependency theory). Some sources use the alternative phrase "Latin America and the Caribbean", as in the United Nations geoscheme for the Americas.

Quebec and Acadia, Francophone parts of North America, are generally excluded from the definition of Latin America.

=== Subregions and countries ===
The four common subregions in Latin America

Latin America can be subdivided into several subregions based on geography, politics, democracy, demographics and culture. The basic geographical subregions are North America, Central America, the Caribbean and South America; the latter contains further politico-geographical subdivisions such as the Southern Cone, the Guianas and the Andean civilizations. It may be subdivided on linguistic grounds into Spanish America and Portuguese America.

Latin America
Country/Territory	Capital(s)	Name(s) in official language(s)	Population (2023)	Area (km^{2})	Density (people/km^{2})	Time zones	Subregion
Argentina	Buenos Aires	Argentina	46,621,847	2,780,400	17	UTC/GMT –3 hours	South America
Bolivia	Sucre and La Paz	Bolivia; Buliwya; Wuliwya; Volívia	12,186,079	1,098,581	11	UTC/GMT –4 hours	South America
Brazil	Brasília	Brasil	218,689,757	8,514,877	26	UTC/GMT –2 hours (Fernando de Noronha); UTC/GMT –3 hours (Brasília); UTC/GMT –4 hours (Amazonas); UTC/GMT –5 hours (Acre)	South America
Chile	Santiago	Chile	18,549,457	756,102	25	UTC/GMT –3 hours (Magallanes and Chilean Antarctica); UTC/GMT –4 hours (Continental Chile); UTC/GMT –6 hours (Easter Island)	South America
Colombia	Bogotá	Colombia	49,336,454	1,141,748	43	UTC/GMT –5 hours	South America
Costa Rica	San José	Costa Rica	5,256,612	51,100	103	UTC/GMT –6 hours	Central America
Cuba	Havana	Cuba	10,985,974	109,884	100	UTC/GMT –5 hours	Caribbean
Dominican Republic	Santo Domingo	República Dominicana	10,790,744	48,192	224	UTC/GMT –4 hours	Caribbean
Ecuador	Quito	Ecuador	17,483,326	256,369	68	UTC/GMT –5 hours (mainland Ecuador); UTC/GMT –6 hours (Galápagos Islands)	South America
El Salvador	San Salvador	El Salvador	6,602,370	21,041	314	UTC/GMT –6 hours	Central America
Guatemala	Guatemala City	Guatemala	17,980,803	108,889	165	UTC/GMT –6 hours	Central America
Honduras	Tegucigalpa	Honduras	9,571,352	112,492	85	UTC/GMT –6 hours	Central America
Mexico	Mexico City	México	129,875,529	1,964,375	66	UTC/GMT –5 hours (Zona Sureste); UTC/GMT –6 hours (Zona Centro); UTC/GMT –7 hours (Zona Pacífico); UTC/GMT –8 hours (Zona Noroeste)	North America
Nicaragua	Managua	Nicaragua	6,359,689	130,373	49	UTC/GMT -6 hours	Central America
Panama	Panama City	Panamá	4,404,108	75,417	58	UTC/GMT –5 hours	Central America
Paraguay	Asunción	Paraguay; Tetã Paraguái	7,439,863	406,752	18	UTC/GMT –4 hours	South America
Peru	Lima	Perú	32,440,172	1,285,216	25	UTC/GMT –5 hours	South America
Puerto Rico*	San Juan	Puerto Rico	3,057,311	8,870	345	UTC/GMT –4 hours	Caribbean
Uruguay	Montevideo	Uruguay	3,416,264	176,215	19	UTC/GMT –3 hours	South America
Venezuela	Caracas	Venezuela	30,518,260	912,050	33	UTC/GMT –4 hours	South America
Total			641,565,971	19,958,943	32		

*: Not a sovereign state

== History ==
Mayan UNESCO World Heritage Site of Chichén Itzá.

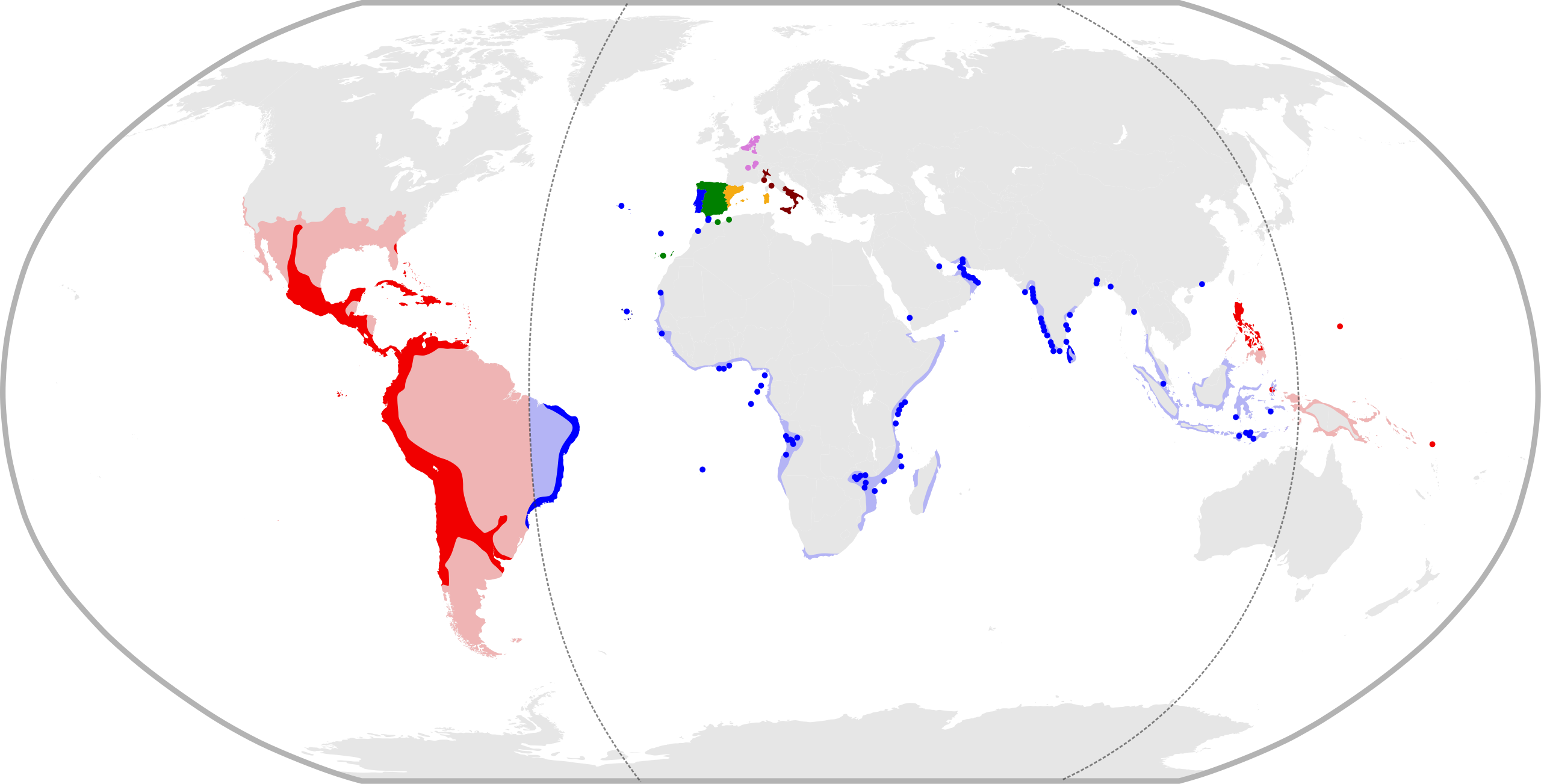
Philip II's dominions in 1598, coloured by governing council: Castile Aragon Portugal Italy the Indies Flanders

Before the arrival of Europeans in the late 15th and early 16th centuries, the region was home to many indigenous peoples, including advanced civilizations, most notably from South: the Olmec, Maya, Muisca, Aztecs and Inca. The region came under control of the kingdoms of Spain and Portugal which established colonies, and imposed Roman Catholicism and their languages. These countries brought African slaves to their colonies as laborers, exploiting large, settled societies and their resources. The Spanish Crown regulated immigration, allowing only Christians to travel to the New World.

The colonization process led to significant native population declines due to disease, forced labor, and violence. They imposed their culture, destroying native codices and artwork. Colonial-era religion played a crucial role in everyday life, with the Spanish Crown ensuring religious purity and aggressively prosecuting perceived deviations like witchcraft. The decline of Spain was the gradual process of financial and military exhaustion and attrition suffered by Spanish Empire throughout the 17th century, in particular when viewed in comparison with ascendant rival powers of the Kingdom of France and Kingdom of England.

Because Catholicism had played such an important role in the Reconquista (Catholic reconquest) of the Iberian Peninsula from the Muslims, the Catholic Church in essence became another arm of the Spanish government, since the crown was granted sweeping powers over ecclesiastical affairs in its overseas territories. The Spanish Crown granted it a large role in the administration of the state, and this practice became even more pronounced in the New World, where prelates often assumed the role of government officials.

Under Philip II of Spain, royal power over Latin America increased, but the crown knew little about its overseas possessions. Although the Council of the Indies was tasked with oversight there, it acted without advice of high officials with direct colonial experience. Another serious problem was that the crown did not know what Spanish laws were in force there.

=== Spanish Golden Age ===
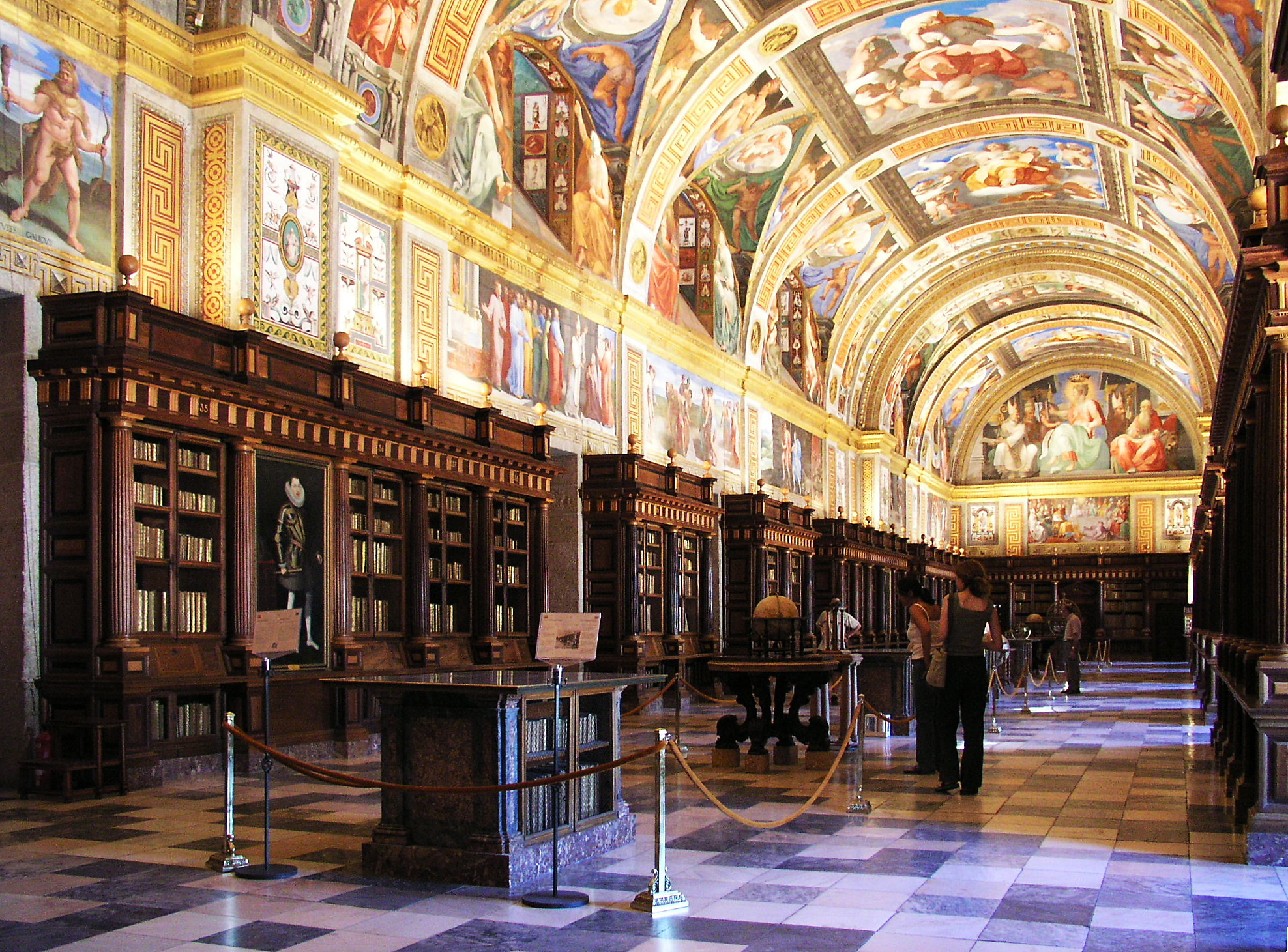
The library of El Escorial

The Spanish Golden Age was a period of intense artistic, literary, and intellectual flourishing in Spain is generally associated with the reigns of Isabella I, Ferdinand II, Charles V, Philip II, Philip III, and Philip IV, during which Spain became a leading political and military power. The Spanish Golden Age is conventionally considered to have begun in 1492, and is often regarded as having ended in 1659 with the Treaty of the Pyrenees, which marked the decline of Spanish hegemony in Europe, although the period is commonly understood to have continued in cultural terms until 1681, the year of Pedro Calderón de la Barca's death.

The era was characterized by extensive royal, aristocratic, and ecclesiastical patronage, which supported literature, painting, architecture, music, and theatre. Major artistic and cultural projects, including El Escorial, contributed to the formation of a distinctive Spanish court and religious culture. The period encompassed the Plateresque and Renaissance styles and extended into the early Spanish Baroque. It produced many of the best-known figures in Spanish cultural history, including Miguel de Cervantes, Lope de Vega, Luis de Góngora, Francisco de Quevedo, Diego Velázquez, and composers such as Tomás Luis de Victoria and Francisco Guerrero.

=== Independence movements ===
In the early nineteenth century nearly all of areas of Spanish America attained independence by armed struggle, with the exceptions of Cuba and Puerto Rico. Brazil, which had become a monarchy separate from Portugal, became a republic in the late nineteenth century. Political independence from European monarchies did not result in the abolition of black slavery in the new nations, and it resulted in political and economic instability in Spanish America immediately after independence. Yet, as regional Caudillos started to rise in power, nation-builders started to view themselves as more modern than their former European colonizers. Leaders began to shift away from aristocracy toward republicanism and democracy, which allowed all citizens, not just the Creole elites, to have a voice in politics. This shift helped unify many of the Latin American nations as all people, even illiterate people, would gather in their communities to talk about political ideals and how they should be used in their nation. Great Britain and the United States exercised significant influence in the post-independence era, resulting in a form of neo-colonialism, where political sovereignty remained in place, but foreign powers exercised considerable power in the economic sphere. Newly independent nations faced domestic and interstate conflicts, struggling with economic instability and social inequality.

The 20th century brought U.S. intervention and the Cold War's impact on the region, with revolutions in countries like Cuba influencing Latin American politics. The late 20th and early 21st centuries saw shifts towards left-wing governments, followed by conservative resurgences, and a recent resurgence of left-wing politics in several countries.

=== After 2000 ===
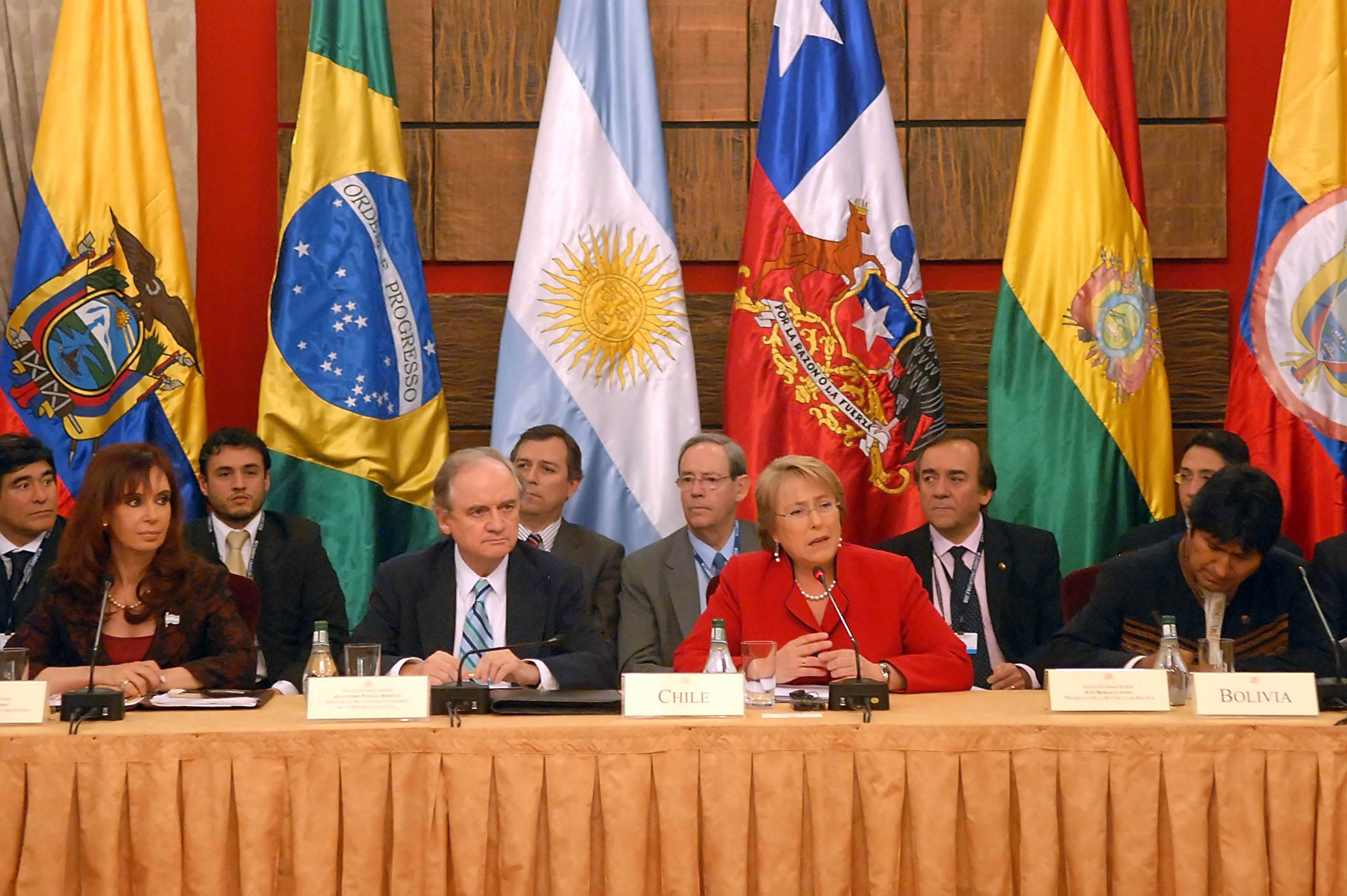
UNASUR summit in the Palacio de la Moneda, Santiago de Chile

In many countries in the early 2000s, left-wing political parties rose to power, known as the Pink tide. The presidencies of Hugo Chávez (1999–2013) in Venezuela, Ricardo Lagos and Michelle Bachelet in Chile, Lula da Silva and Dilma Rousseff of the Workers Party (PT) in Brazil, Néstor Kirchner and his wife Cristina Fernández in Argentina, Tabaré Vázquez and José Mujica in Uruguay, Evo Morales in Bolivia, Daniel Ortega in Nicaragua, Rafael Correa in Ecuador, Fernando Lugo in Paraguay, Manuel Zelaya in Honduras (removed from power by a coup d'état), Mauricio Funes and Salvador Sánchez Cerén in El Salvador are all part of this wave of left-wing politicians who often declare themselves socialists, Latin Americanists, or anti-imperialists, often implying opposition to US policies towards the region. An aspect of this has been the creation of the eight-member ALBA alliance, or "The Bolivarian Alliance for the Peoples of Our America" (Spanish: Alianza Bolivariana para los Pueblos de Nuestra América) by some of these countries.

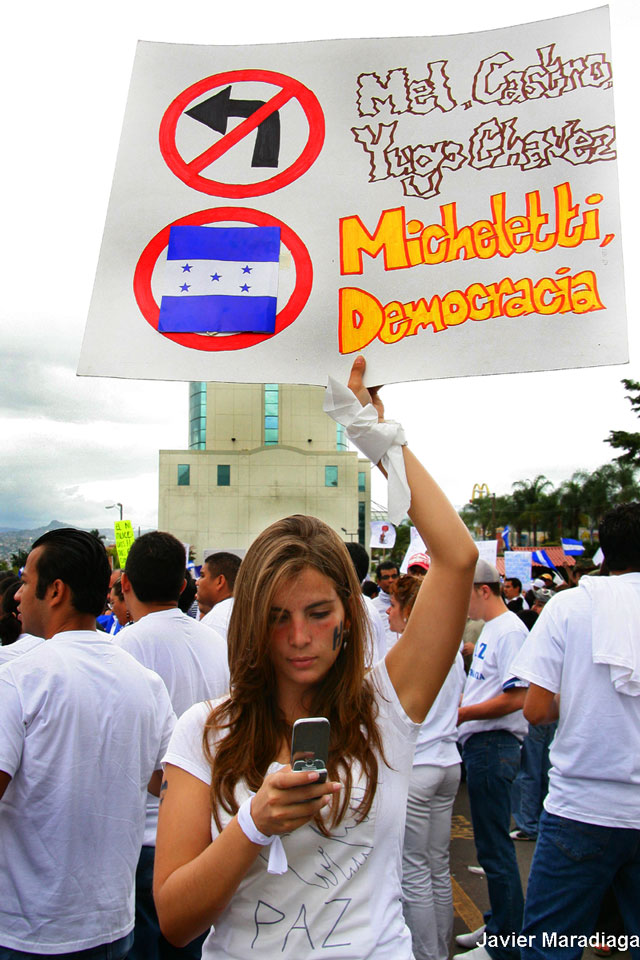
Honduran demonstrator holding a banner with a "don't turn left" sign, 2009

Following the pink tide, there was a Conservative wave across Latin America. In Mexico, the rightwing National Action Party (PAN) won the presidential election of 2000 with its candidate Vicente Fox, ending the 71-year rule of the Institutional Revolutionary Party. He was succeeded six years later by another conservative, Felipe Calderón (2006–2012), who attempted to crack down on the Mexican drug cartels and instigated the Mexican drug war. Several right-wing leaders rose to power, including Argentina's Mauricio Macri and Brazil's Michel Temer, following the impeachment of the country's first female president. In Chile, the conservative Sebastián Piñera succeeded the socialist Michelle Bachelet in 2017. In 2019, center-right Luis Lacalle Pou ended a 15-year leftist rule in Uruguay, after defeating the Broad Front candidate.

Economically, the 2000s commodities boom caused positive effects for many Latin American economies. Another trend was the rapidly increasing importance of their relations with China. However, with the Great Recession beginning in 2008, there was an end to the commodity boom, resulting in economic stagnation or recession in some countries. A number of left-wing governments of the Pink tide lost support. The worst-hit was Venezuela, which is facing severe social and economic upheaval.

Charges against a major Brazilian conglomerate, Odebrecht, have raised allegations of corruption across the region's governments (see Operation Car Wash). This bribery ring has become the largest corruption scandal in Latin American history. As of July 2017, the highest ranking politicians charged were former Brazilian President Luiz Inácio Lula da Silva, who was arrested, and former Peruvian presidents Ollanta Humala and Alejandro Toledo, who fled to the United States and was extradited back to Peru.

The COVID-19 pandemic proved a political challenge for many unstable Latin American democracies, with scholars identifying a decline in civil liberties as a result of opportunistic emergency powers. This was especially true for countries with strong presidential regimes, such as Brazil.

== Geography ==
=== Neotropical realm ===
The Neotropical realm (in purple)

Most of Latin America is part of the Neotropical realm, one of the eight biogeographic realms of Earth's land surface. The Neotropic is delimited by similarities in fauna or flora, which are distinct from the Nearctic realm, which includes most of North America. The Neotropic includes more tropical rainforest (tropical and subtropical moist broadleaf forests) than any other realm. It extends from southern Mexico through Central America and northern South America to southern Brazil, including the vast Amazon rainforest. These rainforest ecoregions are one of the most important reserves of biodiversity on Earth.

=== Climate ===
South America Köppen climate map

As part of the Hadley model of atmospheric circulation, the equator is characterised by the ascending branches of separate meridional cells, driven by intense insolation. The vertical convection draws in air from the surrounding atmosphere, known as the trade winds. As these inward flows of air converge they reduce horizontal wind speed, and as they rise, they form precipitation. The vertical convection also results in a net export of heat and freshwater from the lower atmosphere into the troposphere.

The Great American Interchange was an important late Cenozoic paleozoogeographic biotic interchange event in which land and freshwater fauna migrated from North America to South America via Central America and vice versa, as the volcanic Isthmus of Panama rose up from the sea floor, forming a land bridge between the previously separated continents. Although earlier dispersals had occurred, probably over water, the migration accelerated dramatically about 2.7 million years (Ma) ago during the Piacenzian age. It resulted from the joining of the Neotropic (roughly South American) and Nearctic (roughly North American) biogeographic realms to definitively form the Americas.

=== Environment ===
The environment of Latin America has been changed by human use in the expanding of agriculture, new agricultural technologies, including the Green Revolution, extraction of minerals, growth of cities, and redirection of rivers by the construction of dams for irrigation, drinking water, and hydroelectric power. In the twenty-first century, there is a growing movement to protect nature, and many governments have sought recognition of natural sites by the UNESCO World Heritage Sites. Brazil, Mexico, and Peru currently have the greatest number of natural sites.

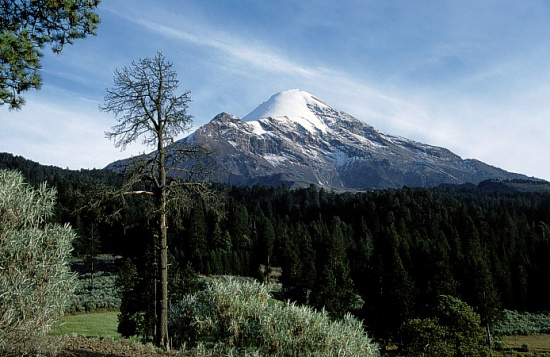

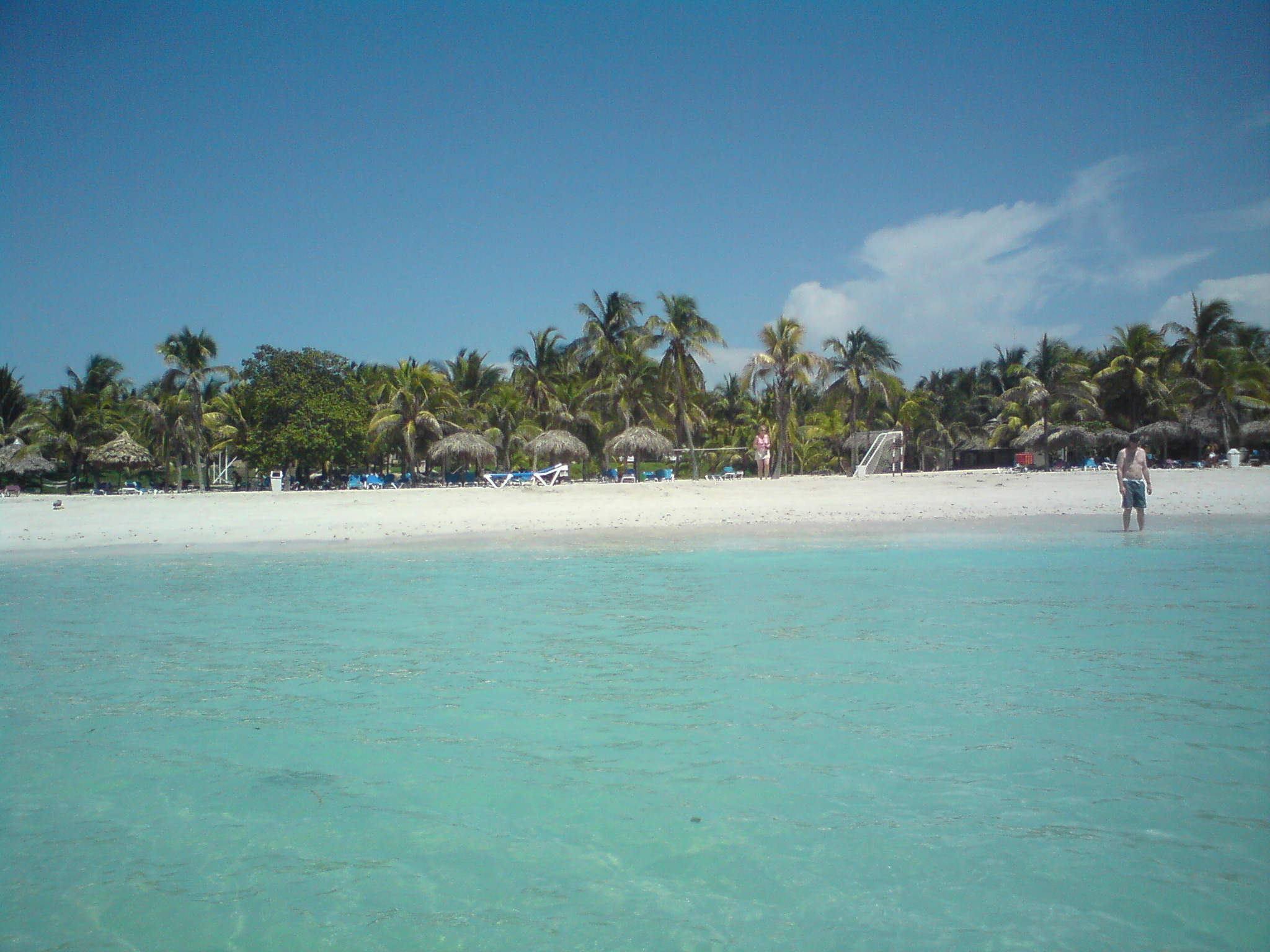

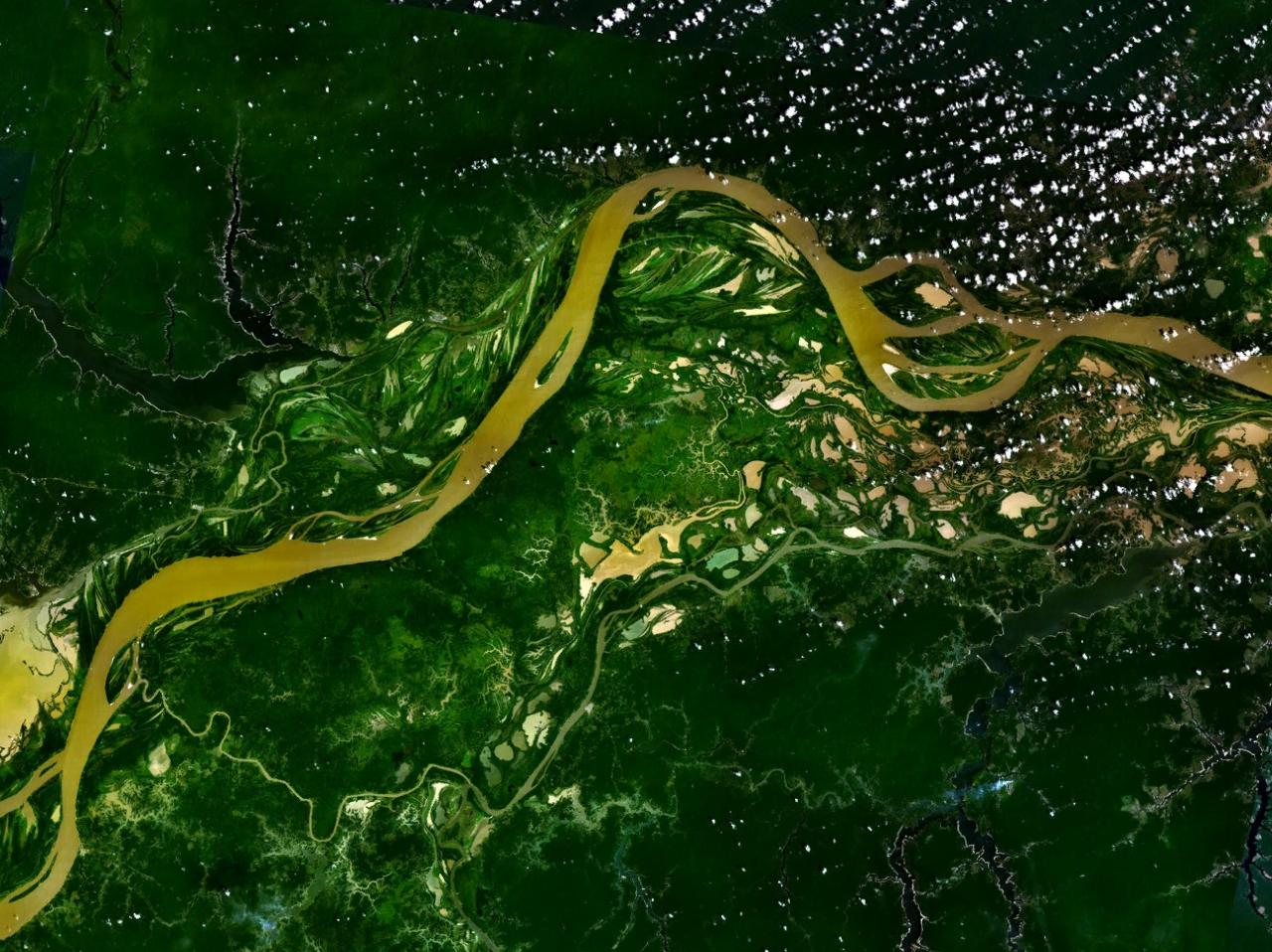

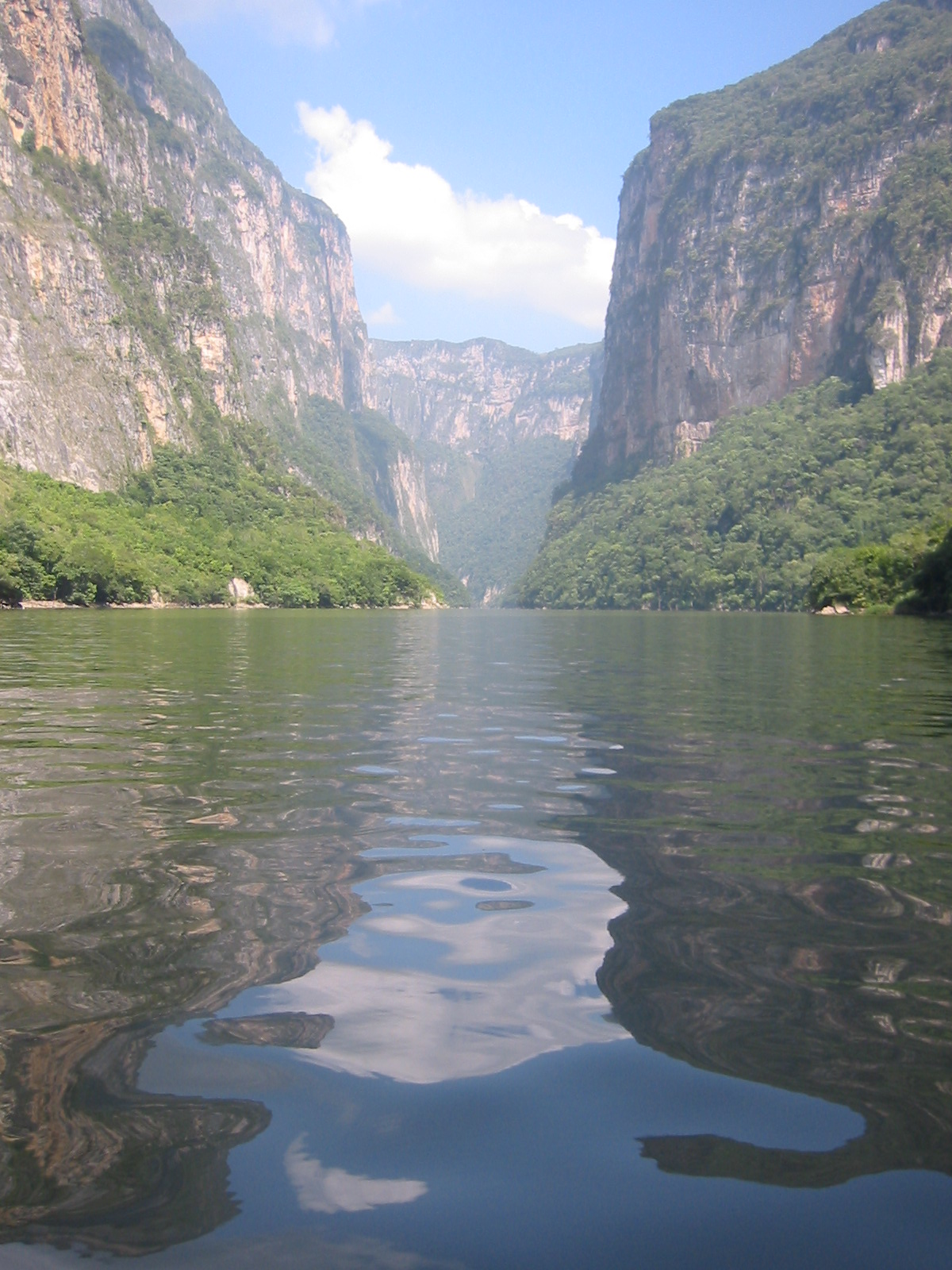
Sumidero Canyon, located in Chiapas, Mexico.

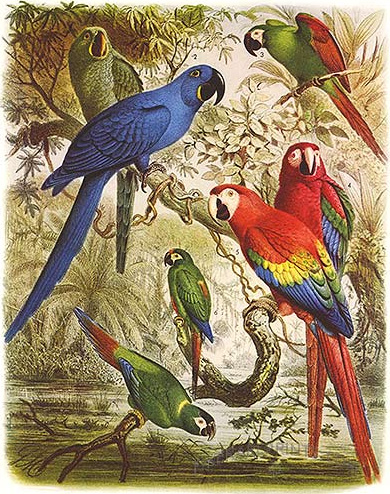
Glaucous macaw (behind hyacinth macaw) and other macaws. Macaws are long-tailed, often colorful New World parrots.

Environmental indicators for Latin American countries
Country	Environmental performance (2026) EPI	CO2 emissions (2009) (tons of CO2 per capita)
Argentina	46.06	4.14
Bolivia	39.25	1.31
Brazil	48.27	1.74
Chile	50.95	3.84
Colombia	48.83	1.33
Costa Rica	49.28	1.37
Cuba	—	2.40
Dominican Republic	38.39	1.79
Ecuador	45.46	2.09
El Salvador	29.54	1.10
Guatemala	31.49	1.03
Honduras	37.37	0.96
Mexico	46.09	3.72
Nicaragua	41.70	0.73
Panama	45.14	2.10
Paraguay	38.95	0.64
Peru	41.01	1.32
Uruguay	36.91	2.31
Venezuela	—	5.45

== Economy ==
=== Economic history ===
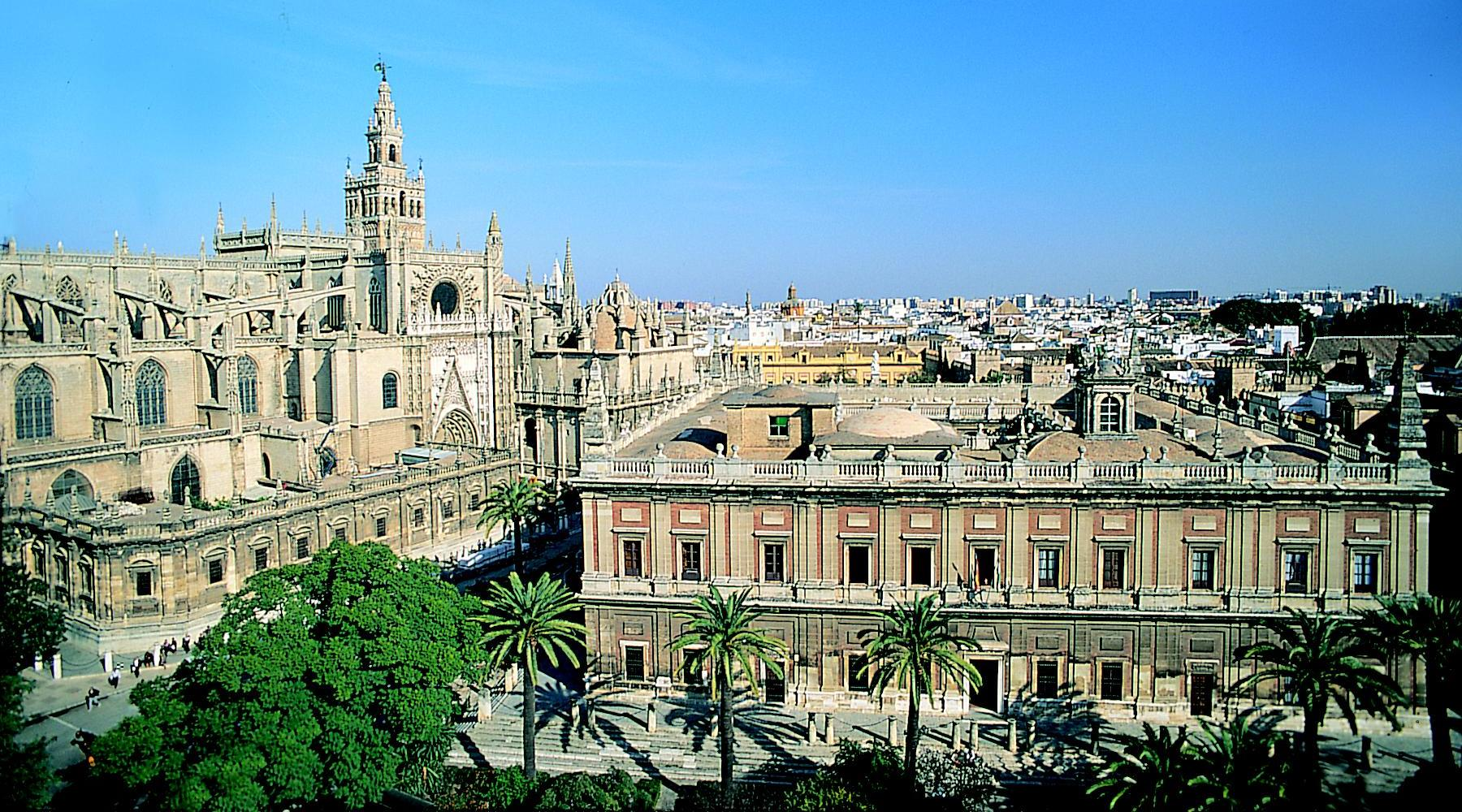
The former Casa Lonja (right), built by Philip II and today the General Archive of the Indies, next to the Cathedral of Seville

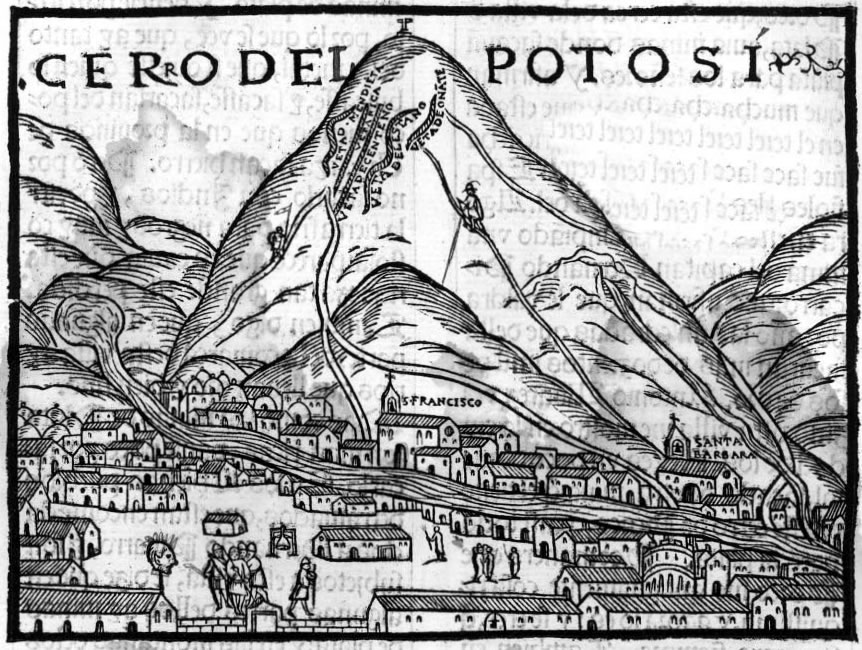
Potosi produced massive amounts of silver from a single site in upper Peru. The first image published in Europe. Pedro Cieza de León, 1553.

Before independence from Spain, international trade was regulated by the royal Casa de Contratación (House of Trade) based in Seville. Inter-regional trade was severely limited with merchants based in Spain and with overseas connections in the main colonial centers controlling the transatlantic trade. Economic thought between 1500 and 1700 was predominantly mercantilist, such as the School of Salamanca. This reflected early modern Europe before the Industrial Revolution but after the Renaissance.

British traders began making inroads into the theoretically closed Spanish system in the eighteenth century. The Spanish crown instituted a series of changes in policy in the eighteenth century after the War of the Spanish Succession, known as the Bourbon Reforms, which were designed to bring the Spanish America under closer crown control. One innovation was comercio libre ("free commerce"), which was not free trade as generally understood. Rather it allowed all Spanish and Spanish American ports to be accessible to each other, excluding foreign traders, in a move to stimulate economic activity yet maintain crown control.

At independence in the early nineteenth century, Spanish America and Brazil had no foreign investment or direct, legal contact with economic partners beyond those allowed within controlled trade. Unlike the later East India Companies, which were chartered companies established by the Dutch, English, and others, the Casa collected all colonial taxes and duties, approved all voyages of exploration and trade, maintained secret information on trade routes and new discoveries, licensed captains, and administered commercial law.

Until the 18th century, Latin America's economy was larger than that of British America, and had a similar level of development. The English and French colonies in North America had a temperate climate and no major indigenous populations whose labor could be exploited. France was developing Colbertism in the 17th century, during the reign of Louis XIV, which would later evolve into Dirigisme.

The Southern United States used plantation agriculture and had large black slave populations, sharing more characteristics with Brazil and the Caribbean than the northern English colonies. The main difference with Latin America is that the southern English colonies are predominantly Protestant to this day, forming a "Bible Belt," rather than Catholic. The northern English colonies were characterized by the family farm, with a homogeneous European-descent population and a much less sharp divide between rich and poor. Unlike Spanish America and Brazil which restricted immigration, the northern English colonies were a magnet for migration, encouraged by the British crown.

=== Size ===
Population and economy size for Latin American countries
Country	Population (2021, millions)	GDP (nominal) (2019, millions US$)	GDP (PPP) (2019, millions US$)
Argentina	45.3	445,469	903,542
Bolivia	12.1	42,401	94,392
Brazil	214.3	1,847,020	3,456,357
Chile	19.5	294,237	502,846
Colombia	51.5	327,895	783,002
Costa Rica	5.2	61,021	91,611
Cuba	11.3	—N/a	—N/a
Dominican Republic	11.1	89,475	201,266
Ecuador	17.8	107,914	202,773
El Salvador	6.3	26,871	55,731
Guatemala	17.6	81,318	153,322
Honduras	10.3	24,449	51,757
Mexico	126.7	1,274,175	2,627,851
Nicaragua	6.9	12,528	34,531
Panama	4.4	68,536	113,156
Paraguay	6.7	40,714	97,163
Peru	33.7	228,989	478,303
Uruguay	3.4	59,918	82,969
Venezuela	28.2	70,140	—N/a
Total	577.8	—N/a	—N/a

=== Agriculture ===
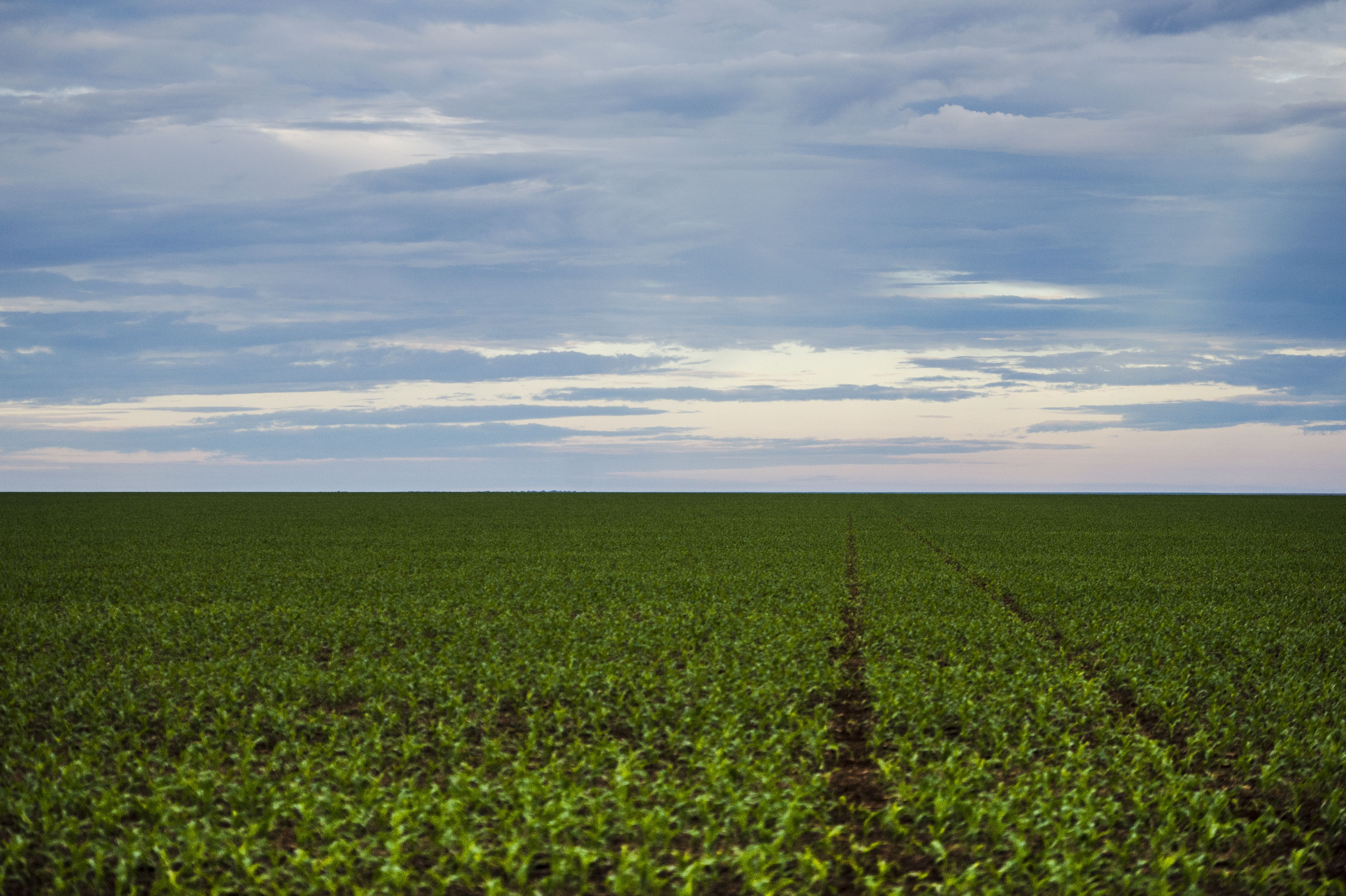
Soybean plantation in Mato Grosso. In 2020, Brazil was the world's largest producer, with 130 million tons. Latin America produces half of the world's soybeans.

The four countries with the strongest agricultural sector in South America are Brazil, Argentina, Chile and Colombia. Currently:

- Brazil is the world's largest producer of sugarcane, soy, coffee, oranges, guaraná, açaí and Brazil nut; is one of the top five producers of maize, papaya, tobacco, pineapple, banana, cotton, beans, coconut, watermelon, lemon and yerba mate; is one of the top ten world producers of cocoa, cashew, avocado, tangerine, persimmon, mango, guava, rice, oat, sorghum and tomato; and is one of the top 15 world producers of grapes, apples, melons, peanuts, figs, peaches, onions, palm oil and natural rubber.
- Argentina is the world's largest producer of yerba mate; is one of the five largest producers in the world of soy, maize, sunflower seeds, lemons and pears, one of the 10 largest producers in the world of barley, grapes, artichokes, tobacco and cotton, and one of the 15 largest producers in the world of wheat, oats, chickpeas, sugarcane, sorghum and grapefruit.
- Chile is one of the five largest world producers of cherries and cranberries, and one of the ten largest world producers of grapes, apples, kiwi, peaches, plums and hazelnuts, focusing on exporting high-value fruits.
- Colombia is one of the five largest producers in the world of coffee, avocados and palm oil, and one of the ten largest producers in the world of sugarcane, bananas, pineapples and cocoa. It is the main producer of Coca, an illegal plant that is the main ingredient in Cocaine
- Peru is the world's largest producer of quinoa; is one of the five largest producers of avocados, blueberry, artichokes and asparagus; one of the ten largest producers in the world of coffee and cocoa; one of the 15 largest producers in the world of potatoes and pineapples, and also has a large production of grapes, sugarcane, rice, bananas, maize and cassava; its agriculture is considerably diversified.
- Paraguay is currently the 6th largest producer of soy in the world and entering the list of the 20 largest producers of maize and sugarcane.

In Central America, the following stand out:

- Guatemala is one of the ten largest producers in the world of coffee, sugar cane, melons and natural rubber, and one of the world's 15 largest producers of bananas and palm oil.
- Honduras is one of the five largest producers of coffee in the world, and one of the ten largest producers of palm oil.
- Costa Rica is the world's largest producer of pineapples.
- Dominican Republic is one of the world's top five producers of papayas and avocados, and one of the ten largest producers of cocoa.
- Mexico is the world's largest producer of avocados, one of the world's top five producers of Chile, lemons, oranges, mangos, papayas, strawberries, grapefruit, pumpkins and asparagus, and one of the world's 10 largest producers of sugar cane, maize, sorghum, beans, tomatoes, coconuts, pineapple, melons and blueberries.

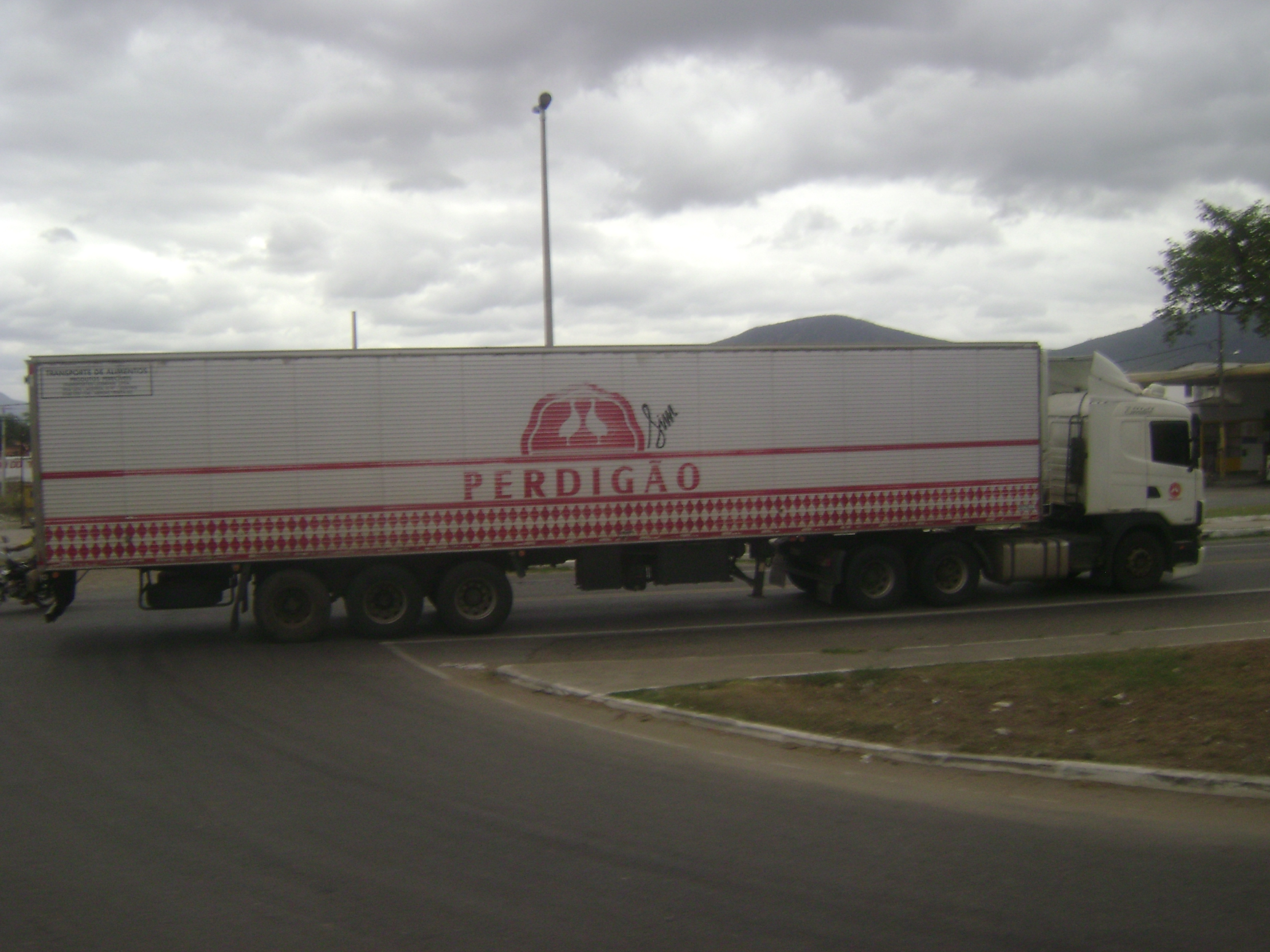
Truck of a meat company in Brazil. Latin America produces 25% of the world's beef and chicken meat.

Brazil is the world's largest exporter of chicken meat: 3.77 million tons in 2019. The country had the second largest herd of cattle in the world, 22.2% of the world herd. The country was the second largest producer of beef in 2019, responsible for 15.4% of global production. It was also the third largest world producer of milk in 2018. This year, the country produced 35.1 billion liters. In 2019, Brazil was the fourth largest pork producer in the world, with almost four million tons.

In 2018, Argentina was the fourth largest producer of beef in the world, with a production of 3 million tons (behind only United States, Brazil and China). Uruguay is also a major meat producer. In 2018, it produced 589 thousand tons of beef.

In the production of chicken meat, Mexico is among the ten largest producers in the world, Argentina among the 15 largest and Peru and Colombia among the 20 largest. In beef production, Mexico is one of the ten largest producers in the world and Colombia is one of the 20 largest producers. In the production of pork, Mexico is among the 15 largest producers in the world. In the production of honey, Argentina is among the five largest producers in the world, Mexico among the ten largest and Brazil among the 15 largest. In terms of cow's milk production, Mexico is among the 15 largest producers in the world and Argentina among the 20 largest.

=== Mining and petroleum ===
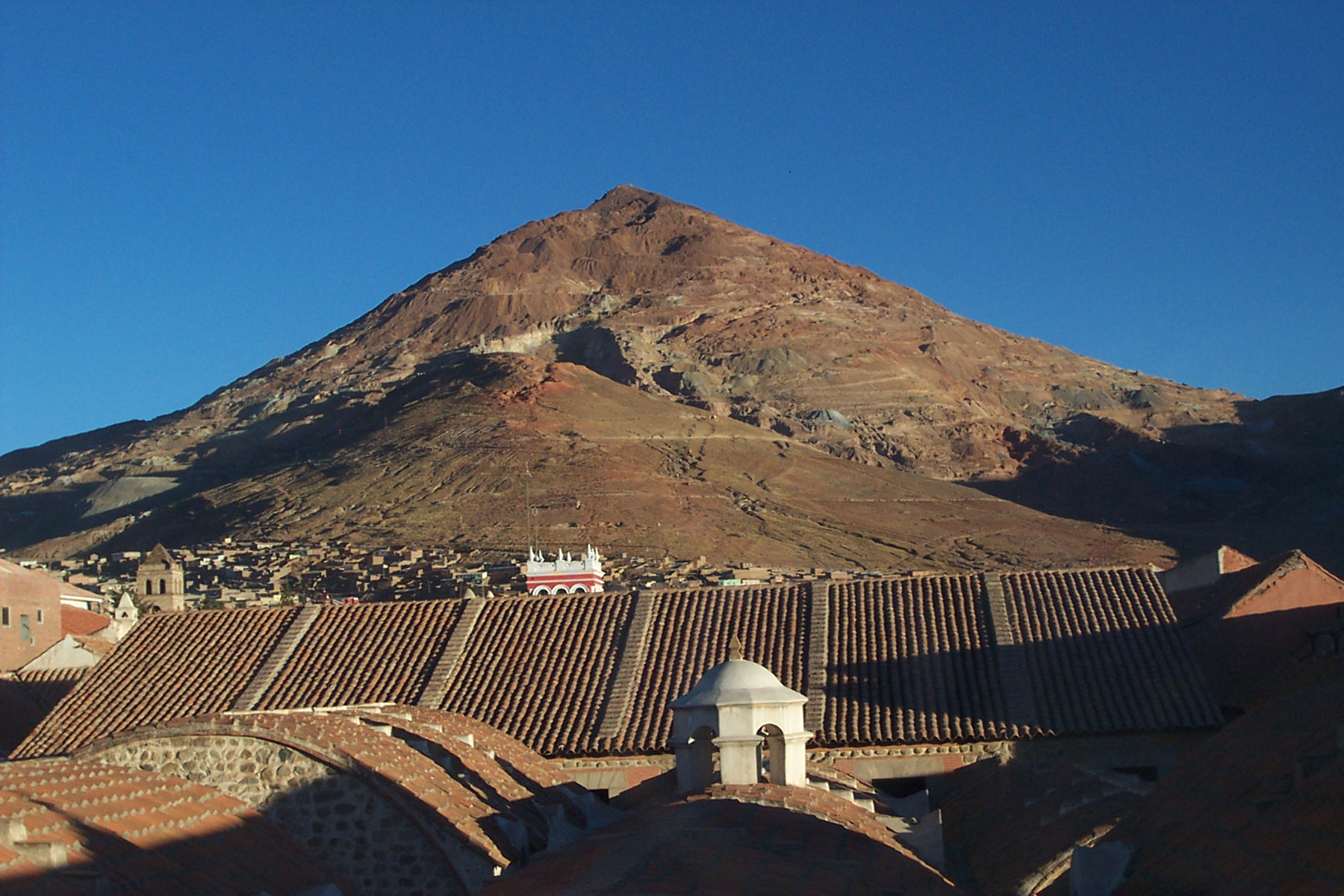
Cerro Rico, Potosi, Bolivia, still a major mine

Mining is one of the most important economic sectors in Latin America, especially for Chile, Peru and Bolivia, whose economies are highly dependent on this sector. The continent has large productions of:

- Gold (mainly in Peru, Mexico, Brazil and Argentina);
- Silver (mainly in Mexico, Peru, Chile, Bolivia and Argentina);
- Copper (mainly in Chile, Peru, Mexico and Brazil);
- Iron ore (Brazil, Peru and Chile);
- Zinc (Peru, Mexico, Bolivia and Brazil);
- Molybdenum (Chile, Peru and Mexico);
- Lithium (Chile, Argentina and Brazil);
- Lead (Peru, Mexico and Bolivia);
- Bauxite (Brazil and Jamaica);
- Tin (Peru, Bolivia and Brazil);
- Manganese (Brazil and Mexico);
- Antimony (Bolivia, Mexico, Guatemala and Ecuador);
- Nickel (Brazil, Dominican Republic and Cuba);
- Niobium (Brazil);
- Rhenium (Chile);
- Iodine (Chile),

Brazil stands out in the extraction of

- Iron ore (where it is the 2nd largest producer and exporter in the world—iron ore is usually one of the three export products that generate the greatest value in the country's trade balance)
- Copper
- Gold
- Bauxite (one of the five largest producers in the world)
- Manganese (one of the five largest producers in the world)
- Tin (one of the largest producers in the world)
- Niobium (98% of known world reserves) and
- Nickel

In terms of gemstones, Brazil is the world's largest producer of amethysts, topaz, and agates and one of the main producers of tourmaline, emeralds, aquamarines, garnets and opals.

Chile contributes about a third of the world's copper production. In addition, Chile was, in 2019, the world's largest producer of iodine and rhenium, the second largest producer of lithium and molybdenum, the sixth largest producer of silver, the seventh largest producer of salt, the eighth largest producer of potash, the thirteenth-largest producer of sulfur and the thirteenth largest producer of iron ore in the world.

In 2019, Peru was the second largest world producer of copper and silver, 8th largest world producer of gold, third largest world producer of lead, second largest world producer of zinc, fourth largest world producer of tin, fifth largest world producer of boron, and fourth largest world producer of molybdenum.

In 2019, Bolivia was the eighth largest world producer of silver; fourth largest world producer of boron; fifth largest world producer of antimony; fifth largest world producer of tin; sixth largest world producer of tungsten; seventh largest producer of zinc, and the eighth largest producer of lead.

In 2019, Mexico was the world's largest producer of silver (representing almost 23% of world production, producing more than 200 million ounces in 2019); ninth largest producer of gold, the eighth largest producer of copper, the world's fifth largest producer of lead, the world's sixth largest producer of zinc, the world's fifth largest producer of molybdenum, the world's third largest producer of mercury, the world's fifth largest producer of bismuth, the world's 13th largest producer of manganese and the 23rd largest world producer of phosphate. It is also the eighth largest world producer of salt.

In 2019, Argentina was the fourth largest world producer of lithium, the ninth largest world producer of silver, the 17th largest world producer of gold and the seventh largest world producer of boron.

Colombia is the world's largest producer of emeralds. In the production of gold, between 2006 and 2017, the country produced 15 tons per year until 2007, when its production increased significantly, breaking a record of 66.1 tons extracted in 2012. In 2017, it extracted 52.2 tons. The country is among the 25 largest gold producers in the world. In the production of silver, in 2017 the country extracted 15,5 tons.

In oil production, Brazil was the tenth largest oil producer in the world in 2019, with 2.8 million barrels a day. Mexico was the twelfth largest, with 2.1 million barrels a day, Colombia in 20th place with 886 thousand barrels a day, Venezuela was the twenty-first place, with 877 thousand barrels a day, Ecuador in 28th with 531 thousand barrels a day and Argentina. 29th with 507 thousand barrels a day. Since Venezuela and Ecuador consume little oil and export most of their production, they are part of OPEC. Venezuela had a big drop in production after 2015 (when it produced 2.5 million barrels a day), falling in 2016 to 2.2 million, in 2017 to 2 million, in 2018 to 1.4 million and in 2019 to 877 thousand, due to lack of investment.

In natural gas production, in 2018, Argentina produced 1,524 bcf (billions of cubic feet), Mexico produced 999, Venezuela 946, Brazil 877, Bolivia 617, Peru 451, Colombia 379.

In coal production, the continent had three of the 30 largest world producers in 2018: Colombia (12th), Mexico (24th) and Brazil (27th).

=== Manufacturing ===
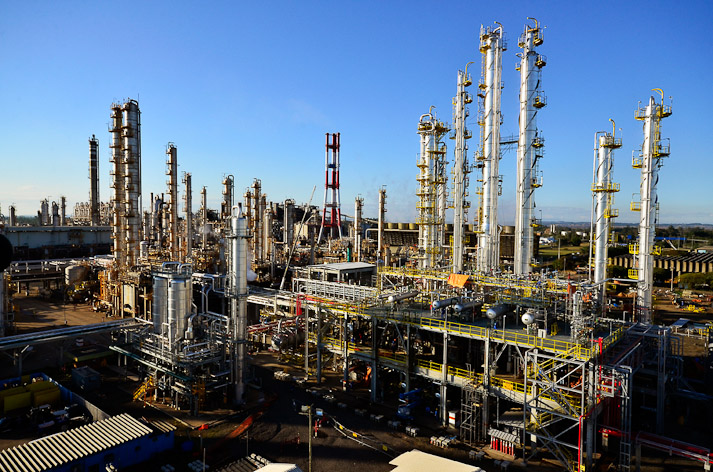
Braskem, the largest Brazilian chemical industry

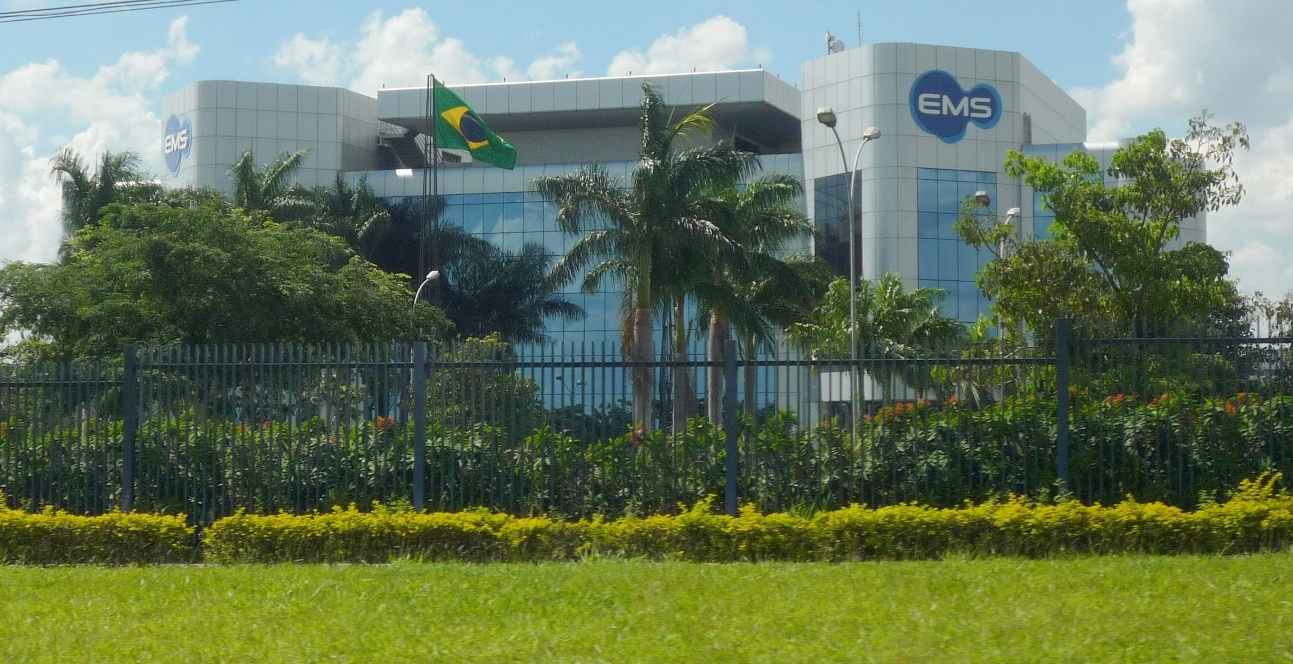
EMS, the largest Brazilian pharmaceutical industry

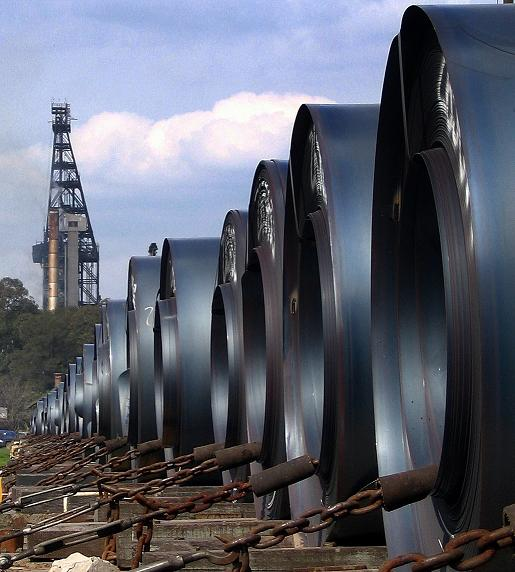
Steel production in San Nicolás, Argentina.

The World Bank annually lists the top manufacturing countries by total manufacturing value. According to the 2019 list:

- Mexico had the twelfth most valuable industry in the world (US$217.8 billion)
- Brazil the thirteenth largest (US$173.6 billion)
- Venezuela the thirtieth largest (US$58.2 billion, however, it depends on oil to reach this value)
- Argentina the 31st largest (US$57.7 billion)
- Colombia the 46th largest (US$35.4 billion)
- Peru the 50th largest (US$28.7 billion)
- Chile the 51st largest (US$28.3 billion).

In Latin America, few countries stand out in industrial activity: Brazil, Argentina, Mexico and, less prominently, Chile. Begun late, the industrialization of these countries received a great boost from World War II: this prevented the countries at war from buying the products they were used to importing and exporting what they produced. At that time, benefiting from the abundant local raw material, the low wages paid to the labor force and a certain specialization brought by immigrants, countries such as Brazil, Mexico and Argentina, as well as Venezuela, Chile, Colombia and Peru, were able to implement important industrial parks. In general, in these countries there are industries that require little capital and simple technology for their installation, such as the food processing and textile industries. The basic industries (steel, etc.) also stand out, as well as the metallurgical and mechanical industries.

The industrial parks of Brazil, Mexico, Argentina and Chile, however, present much greater diversity and sophistication, producing advanced technology items. In the rest of Latin American countries, mainly in Central America, the processing industries of primary products for export predominate.

In the food industry, in 2019, Brazil was the second largest exporter of processed foods in the world. In 2016, the country was the second largest producer of pulp in the world and the eighth largest producer of paper. In the footwear industry, in 2019, Brazil ranked fourth among world producers. In 2019, the country was the eighth largest producer of vehicles and the ninth largest producer of steel in the world. In 2018, the chemical industry of Brazil was the eighth largest in the world. In the textile industry, Brazil, although it was among the five largest world producers in 2013, is very little integrated into world trade. In the aviation sector, Brazil has Embraer, the third largest aircraft manufacturer in the world, behind Boeing and Airbus.

=== Infrastructure ===
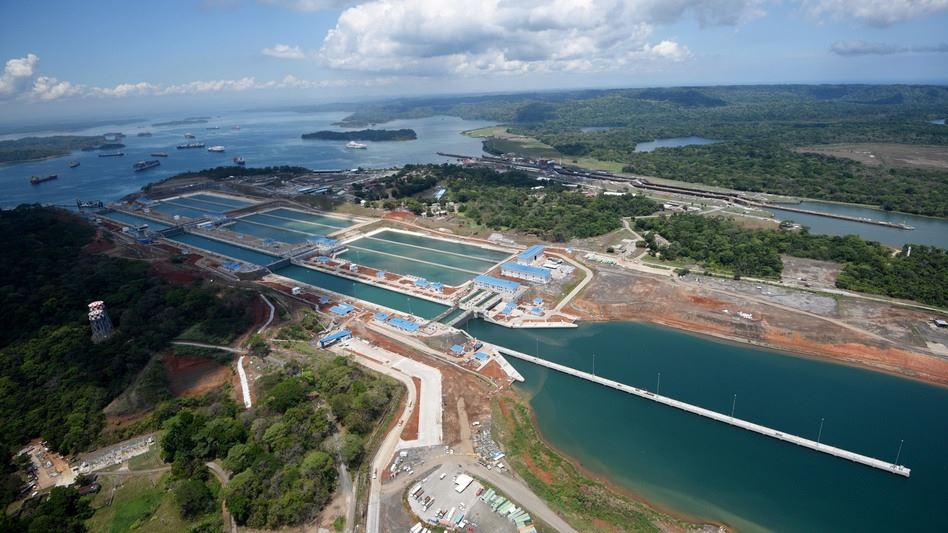
Panama Canal expansion project; New Agua Clara locks (Atlantic side)

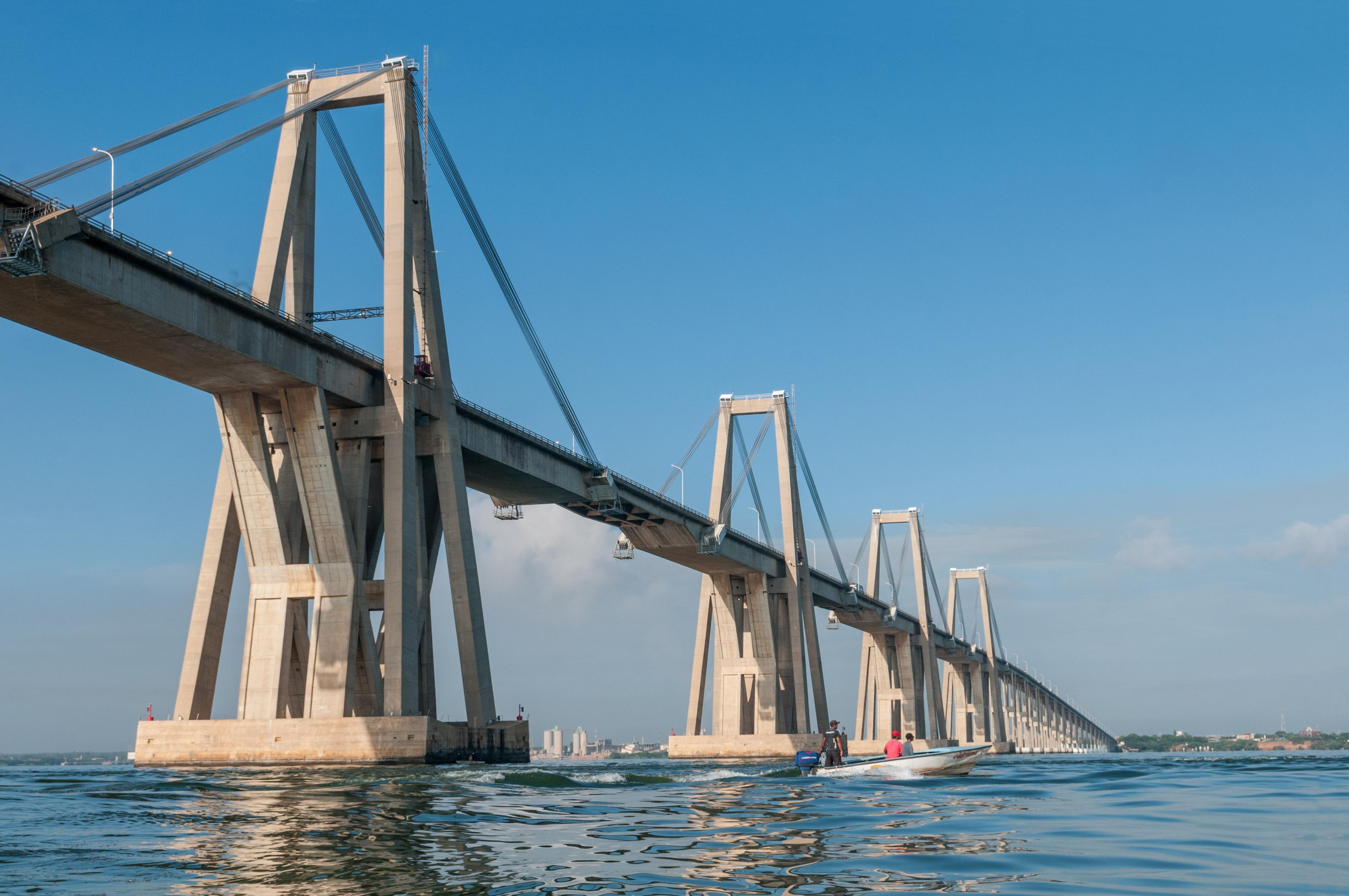
General Rafael Urdaneta Bridge

Transport in Latin America is carried out primarily by road, the most developed mode in the region. There is also considerable port and airport infrastructure. The railway and fluvial sector, although it has potential, is usually treated in a secondary way.

Brazil has more than 1,700,000 km (1,100,000 mi) of roads, of which 215,000 km (134,000 mi) are paved, and about 14,000 km (8,700 mi) are divided highways. The two most important highways in the country are BR-101 and BR-116. Argentina has more than 600,000 km (370,000 mi) of roads, of which about 70,000 km (43,000 mi) are paved, and about 2,500 km (1,600 mi) are divided highways. The three most important highways in the country are Route 9, Route 7 and Route 14. Colombia has about 210,000 km (130,000 mi) of roads, and about 2,300 km (1,400 mi) are divided highways. Chile has about 82,000 km (51,000 mi) of roads, 20,000 km (12,000 mi) of which are paved, and about 2,000 km (1,200 mi) are divided highways. The most important highway in the country is the Route 5 (Pan-American Highway) These 4 countries have the most developed road infrastructure and the largest number of double-lane highways in South America.

The roadway network in Mexico has an extent of 366,095 km (227,481 mi), of which 116,802 km (72,577 mi) are paved, Of these, 10,474 km (6,508 mi) are multi-lane expressways: 9,544 km (5,930 mi) are four-lane highways and the rest have 6 or more lanes.

Due to the Andes Mountains, Amazon River and Amazon Forest, there have always been difficulties in implementing transcontinental or bioceanic highways. Practically the only route that existed was the one that connected Brazil to Buenos Aires, in Argentina and later to Santiago, in Chile. However, in recent years, with the combined effort of countries, new routes have started to emerge, such as Brazil-Peru (Interoceanic Highway), and a new highway between Brazil, Paraguay, northern Argentina and northern Chile (Bioceanic Corridor).

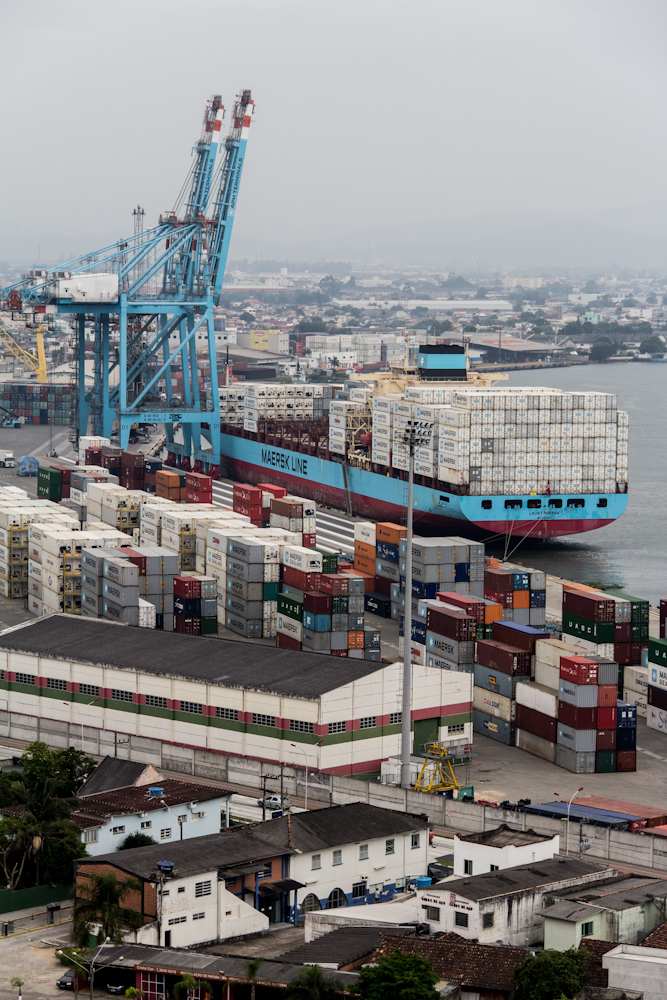
Port of Itajaí, Santa Catarina, Brazil

There are more than 2,000 airports in Brazil. The country has the second largest number of airports in the world, behind only the United States. São Paulo International Airport, located in the Metropolitan Region of São Paulo, is the largest and busiest in the country – the airport connects São Paulo to practically all major cities around the world. Brazil has 44 international airports, such as those in Rio de Janeiro, Brasília, Belo Horizonte, Porto Alegre, Florianópolis, Cuiabá, Salvador, Recife, Fortaleza, Belém and Manaus, among others. Argentina has important international airports such as Buenos Aires, Cordoba, Bariloche, Mendoza, Salta, Puerto Iguazú, Neuquén and Ushuaia, among others. Chile has important international airports such as Santiago, Antofagasta, Puerto Montt, Punta Arenas and Iquique, among others. Colombia has important international airports such as Bogotá, Medellín, Cartagena, Cali and Barranquilla, among others. Peru has important international airports such as Lima, Cuzco and Arequipa. Other important airports are those in the capitals of Uruguay (Montevideo), Paraguay (Asunción), Bolivia (La Paz) and Ecuador (Quito). The 10 busiest airports in South America in 2017 were: São Paulo-Guarulhos (Brazil), Bogotá (Colombia), São Paulo-Congonhas (Brazil), Santiago (Chile), Lima (Peru), Brasília (Brazil), Rio de Janeiro (Brazil), Buenos Aires-Aeroparque (Argentina), Buenos Aires-Ezeiza (Argentina), and Minas Gerais (Brazil).

There are 1,580 airports in Mexico, the fourth-largest number of airports by country in the world. The seven largest airports—which absorb 90% of air travel—are (in order of air traffic): Mexico City, Cancún, Guadalajara, Monterrey, Tijuana, Acapulco, and Puerto Vallarta. Considering all of Latin America, the 10 busiest airports in 2024 were: Bogotá (Colombia), Mexico City (Mexico), São Paulo-Guarulhos (Brazil), Cancún (Mexico), Santiago (Chile), Lima (Peru), São Paulo-Congonhas (Brazil), Tocumen (Panama), Guadalajara (Mexico) and Brasilia (Brazil).

Brazil has some of the busiest ports in South America, such as Port of Santos, Port of Rio de Janeiro, Port of Paranaguá, Port of Itajaí, Port of Rio Grande, Port of São Francisco do Sul and Suape Port. Argentina has ports such as Port of Buenos Aires and Port of Rosario. Chile has important ports in Valparaíso, Caldera, Mejillones, Antofagasta, Iquique, Arica and Puerto Montt. Colombia has important ports such as Buenaventura, Cartagena Container Terminal and Puerto Bolivar. Peru has important ports in Callao, Ilo and Matarani. The 15 busiest ports in South America are: Port of Santos (Brazil), Port of Bahia de Cartagena (Colombia), Callao (Peru), Guayaquil (Ecuador), Buenos Aires (Argentina), San Antonio (Chile), Buenaventura (Colombia), Itajaí (Brazil), Valparaíso (Chile), Montevideo (Uruguay), Paranaguá (Brazil), Rio Grande (Brazil), São Francisco do Sul (Brazil), Manaus (Brazil) and Coronel (Chile).

The four major seaports concentrating around 60% of the merchandise traffic in Mexico are Altamira and Veracruz in the Gulf of Mexico, and Manzanillo and Lázaro Cárdenas in the Pacific Ocean. Considering all of Latin America, the 10 largest ports in terms of movement are: Colon (Panama), Santos (Brazil), Manzanillo (Mexico), Bahia de Cartagena (Colombia), Pacifico (Panama), Callao (Peru), Guayaquil (Ecuador), Buenos Aires (Argentina), San Antonio (Chile) and Buenaventura (Colombia).

The Brazilian railway network has an extension of about 30,000 kilometers. It is basically used for transporting ores. The Argentine rail network, with 47,000 km of tracks, was one of the largest in the world and continues to be the most extensive in Latin America. It came to have about 100,000 km of rails, but the lifting of tracks and the emphasis placed on motor transport gradually reduced it. It has four different trails and international connections with Paraguay, Bolivia, Chile, Brazil and Uruguay. Chile has almost 7,000 km of railways, with connections to Argentina, Bolivia and Peru. Colombia has only about 3,500 km of railways.

Among the main Brazilian waterways, two stand out: Hidrovia Tietê-Paraná (which has a length of 2,400 km, 1,600 on the Paraná River and 800 km on the Tietê River, draining agricultural production from the states of Mato Grosso, Mato Grosso do Sul, Goiás and part of Rondônia, Tocantins and Minas General) and Hidrovia do Solimões-Amazonas (it has two sections: Solimões, which extends from Tabatinga to Manaus, with approximately 1600 km, and Amazonas, which extends from Manaus to Belém, with 1650 km. Almost entirely passenger transport from the Amazon plain is done by this waterway, in addition to practically all cargo transportation that is directed to the major regional centers of Belém and Manaus). In Brazil, this transport is still underutilized: the most important waterway stretches, from an economic point of view, are found in the Southeast and South of the country. Its full use still depends on the construction of locks, major dredging works and, mainly, of ports that allow intermodal integration. In Argentina, the waterway network is made up of the La Plata, Paraná, Paraguay and Uruguay rivers. The main river ports are Zárate and Campana. The port of Buenos Aires is historically the first in individual importance, but the area known as Up-River, which stretches along 67 km of the Santa Fé portion of the Paraná River, brings together 17 ports that concentrate 50% of the total exports of the country.

=== Energy ===
As of 2023, Latin America and the Caribbean generates 60% of its electricity from renewable energy – double the global average of 30%. Despite this, fossil fuels still play a substantial role, especially in transportation and industry, with oil and gas constituting a notable portion. Approximately two-thirds of the region's energy mix comes from fossil fuels, Of the region's total energy production, 43% is hydroelectric, 8% wind and 6% is solar.

==== Brazil ====
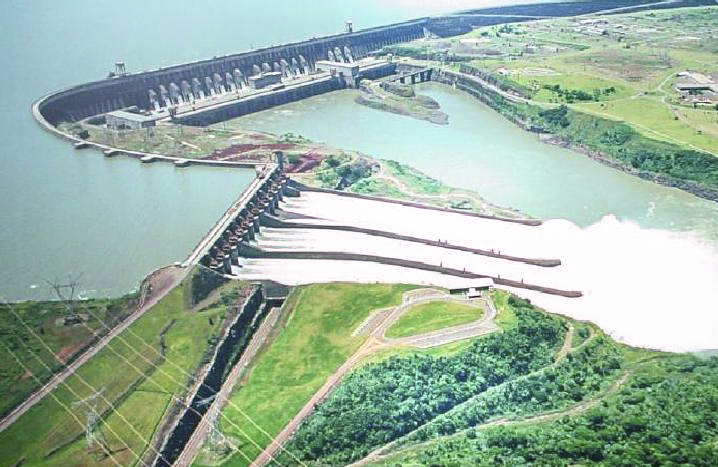
Itaipu Dam in Paraná

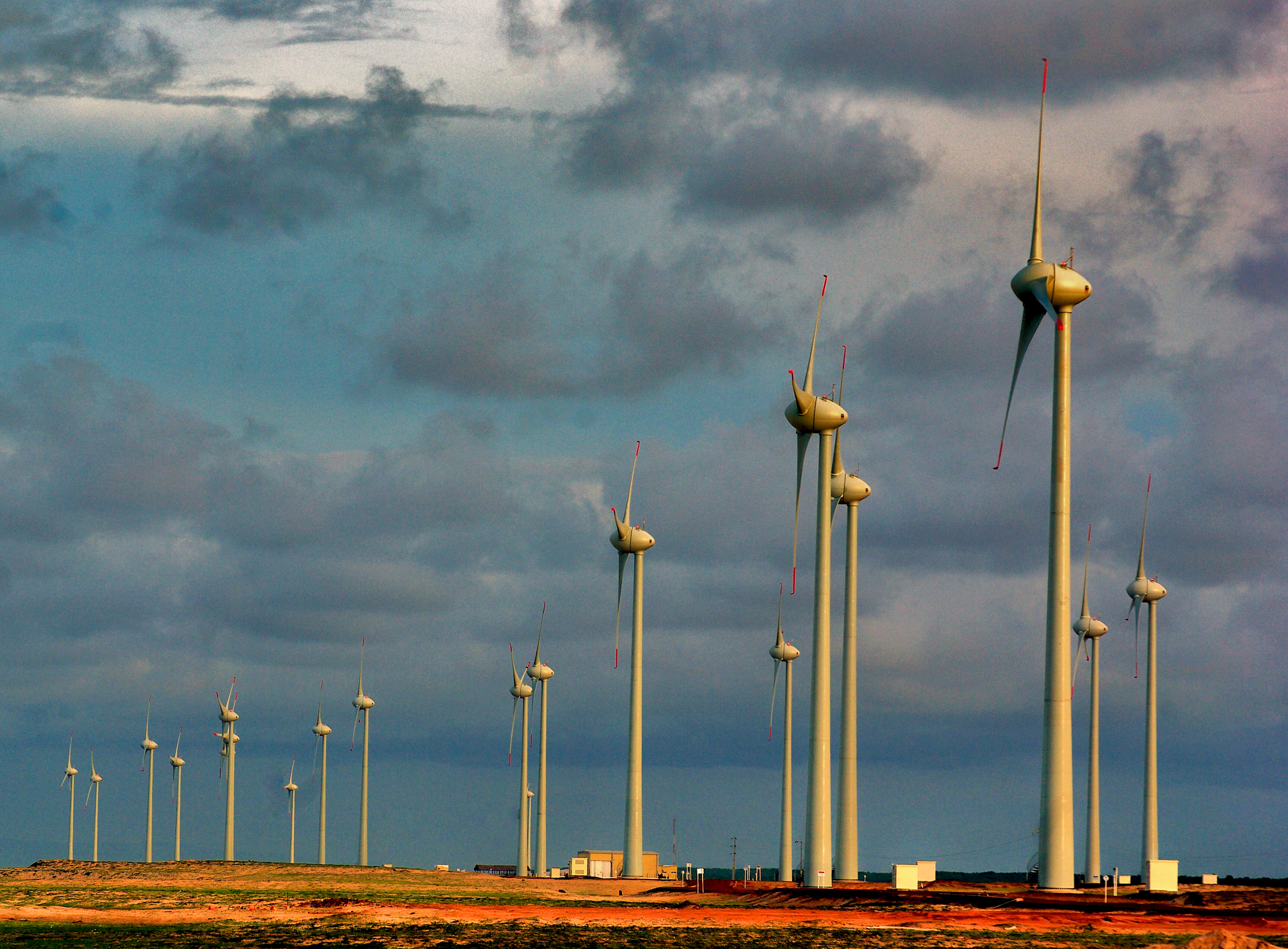
Wind power in Parnaíba

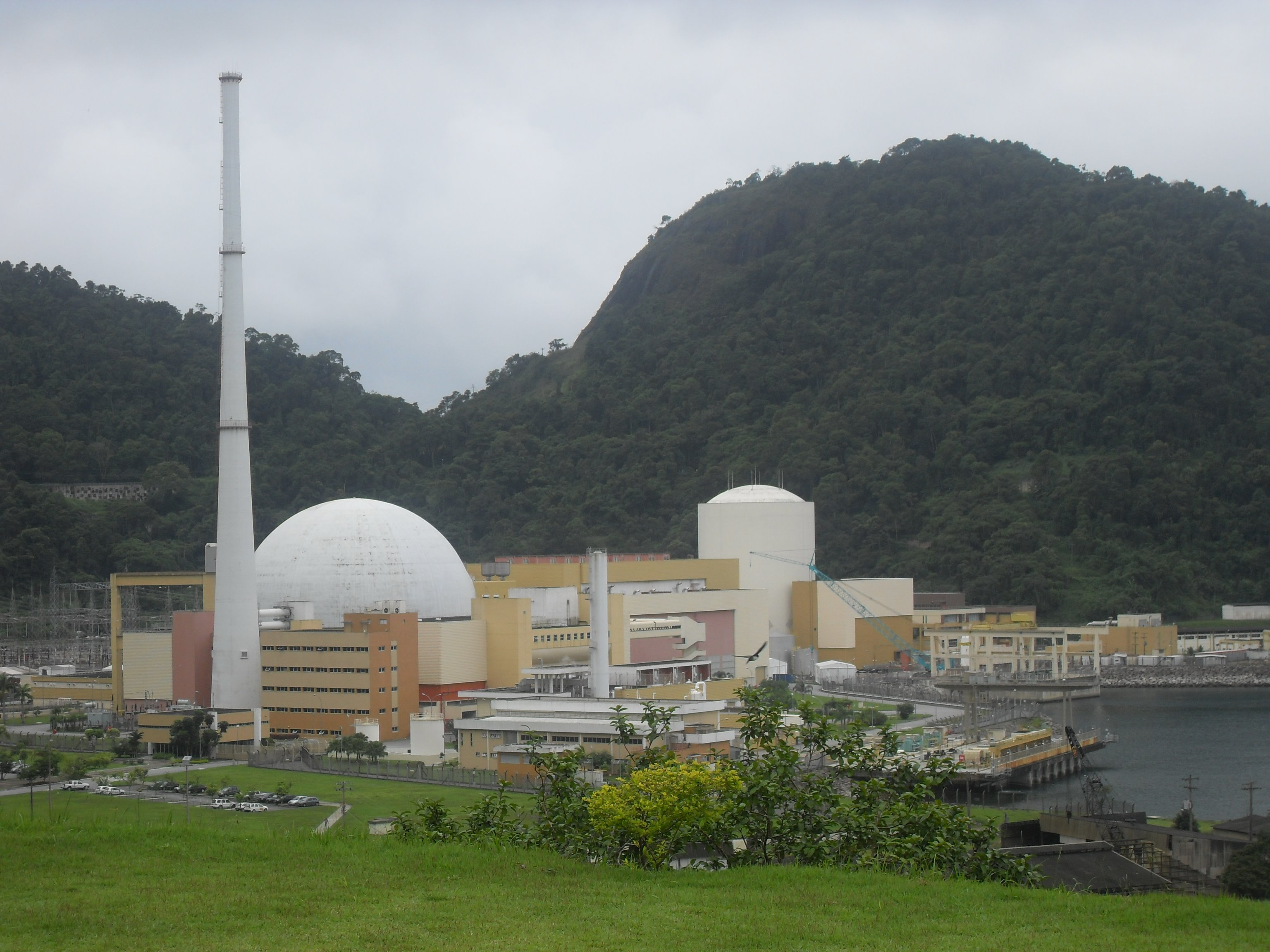
Angra Nuclear Power Plant in Angra dos Reis, Rio de Janeiro

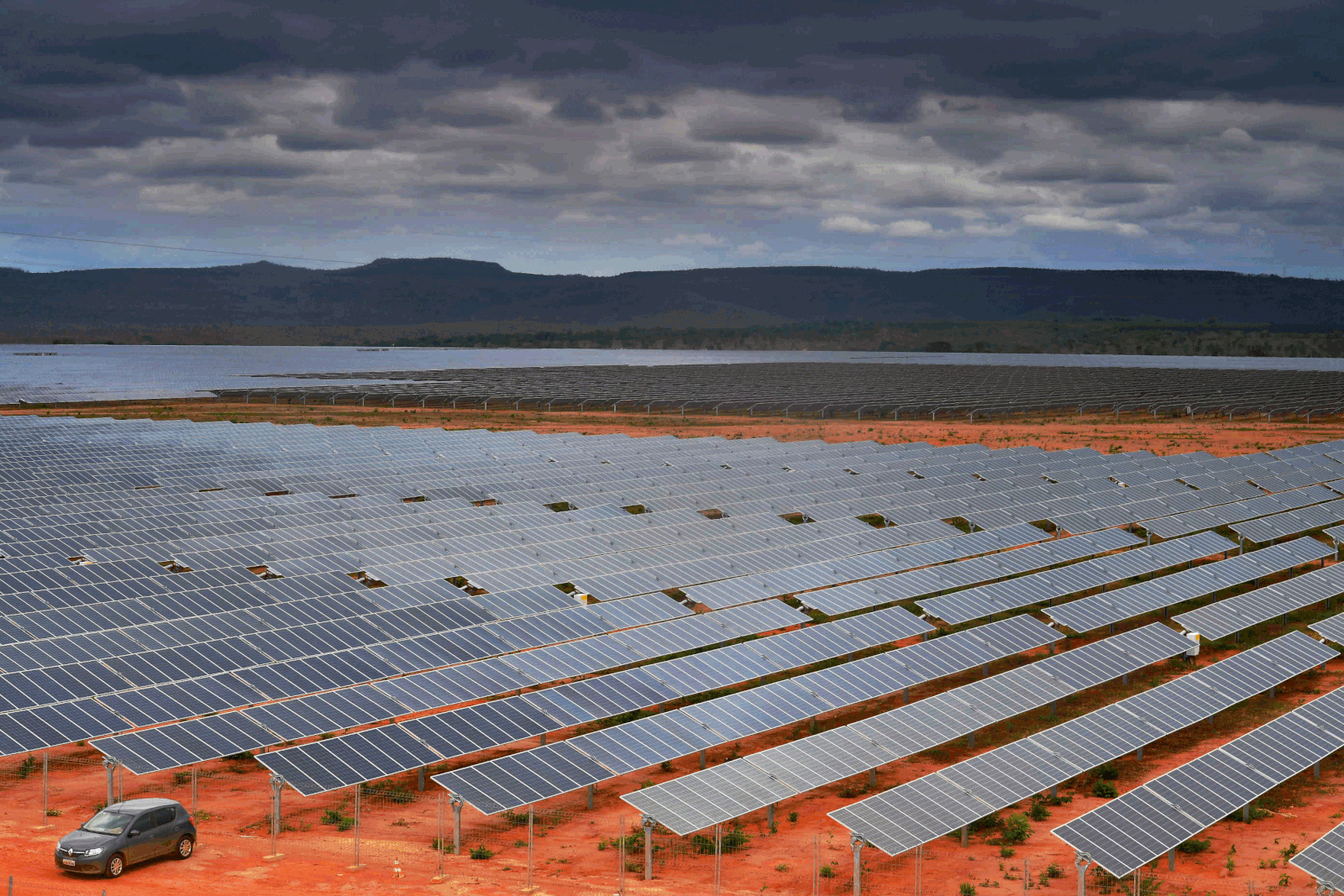
Pirapora Solar Complex, the largest in Brazil and Latin America with a capacity of 321 MW

The Brazilian government has undertaken an ambitious program to reduce dependence on imported petroleum. Imports previously accounted for more than 70% of the country's oil needs but Brazil became self-sufficient in oil in 2006–2007. Brazil was the 10th largest oil producer in the world in 2019, with 2.8 million barrels / day. Production manages to supply the country's demand. In the beginning of 2020, in the production of oil and natural gas, the country exceeded 4 million barrels of oil equivalent per day, for the first time. In January this year, 3.168 million barrels of oil per day and 138.753 million cubic meters of natural gas were extracted.

Brazil is one of the main world producers of hydroelectric power. In 2019, Brazil had 217 hydroelectric plants in operation, with an installed capacity of 98,581 MW, 60.16% of the country's energy generation. In the total generation of electricity, in 2019 Brazil reached 170,000 megawatts of installed capacity, more than 75% from renewable sources (the majority, hydroelectric).

In 2013, the Southeast Region used about 50% of the load of the National Integrated System (SIN), being the main energy consuming region in the country. The region's installed electricity generation capacity totaled almost 42,500 MW, which represented about a third of Brazil's generation capacity. The hydroelectric generation represented 58% of the region's installed capacity, with the remaining 42% corresponding basically to the thermoelectric generation. São Paulo accounted for 40% of this capacity; Minas Gerais by about 25%; Rio de Janeiro by 13.3%; and Espírito Santo accounted for the rest. The South Region owns the Itaipu Dam, which was the largest hydroelectric plant in the world for several years, until the inauguration of Three Gorges Dam in China. It remains the second largest operating hydroelectric in the world. Brazil is the co-owner of the Itaipu Plant with Paraguay: the dam is located on the Paraná River, located on the border between countries. It has an installed generation capacity of 14 GW for 20 generating units of 700 MW each. North Region has large hydroelectric plants, such as Belo Monte Dam and Tucuruí Dam, which produce much of the national energy. Brazil's hydroelectric potential has not yet been fully exploited, so the country still has the capacity to build several renewable energy plants in its territory.

As of July 2022, according to ONS, total installed capacity of wind power was 22 GW, with average capacity factor of 58%. While the world average wind production capacity factors is 24.7%, there are areas in Northern Brazil, specially in Bahia State, where some wind farms record with average capacity factors over 60%; the average capacity factor in the Northeast Region is 45% in the coast and 49% in the interior. In 2019, wind energy represented 9% of the energy generated in the country. In 2019, it was estimated that the country had an estimated wind power generation potential of around 522 GW (this, only onshore), enough energy to meet three times the country's current demand. In 2021 Brazil was the 7th country in the world in terms of installed wind power (21 GW), and the 4th largest producer of wind energy in the world (72 TWh), behind only China, USA and Germany.

Nuclear energy accounts for about 4% of Brazil's electricity. The nuclear power generation monopoly is owned by Eletronuclear (Eletrobrás Eletronuclear S/A), a wholly owned subsidiary of Eletrobrás. Nuclear energy is produced by two reactors at Angra. It is located at the Central Nuclear Almirante Álvaro Alberto (CNAAA) on the Praia de Itaorna in Angra dos Reis, Rio de Janeiro. It consists of two pressurized water reactors, Angra I, with capacity of 657 MW, connected to the power grid in 1982, and Angra II, with capacity of 1,350 MW, connected in 2000. A third reactor, Angra III, with a projected output of 1,350 MW, is planned to be finished.

As of October 2022, according to ONS, total installed capacity of photovoltaic solar was 21 GW, with average capacity factor of 23%. Some of the most irradiated Brazilian States are MG ("Minas Gerais"), BA ("Bahia") and GO ("Goiás"), which have indeed world irradiation level records. In 2019, solar power represented 1.27% of the energy generated in the country. In 2021, Brazil was the 14th country in the world in terms of installed solar power (13 GW), and the 11th largest producer of solar energy in the world (16.8 TWh).

In 2020, Brazil was the 2nd largest country in the world in the production of energy through biomass (energy production from solid biofuels and renewable waste), with 15,2 GW installed.

==== Other countries ====
After Brazil, Mexico is the country in Latin America that most stands out in energy production. In 2020, the country was the 14th largest petroleum producer in the world, and in 2018 it was the 12th largest exporter. In natural gas, the country was, in 2015, the 21st largest producer in the world, and in 2007 it was the 29th largest exporter. Mexico was also the world's 24th largest producer of coal in 2018. In renewable energies, in 2020, the country ranked 14th in the world in terms of installed wind energy (8.1 GW), 20th in the world in terms of installed solar energy (5.6 GW) and 19th in the world in terms of installed hydroelectric power (12.6 GW). In third place, Colombia stands out: In 2020, the country was the 20th largest petroleum producer in the world, and in 2015 it was the 19th largest exporter. In natural gas, the country was, in 2015, the 40th largest producer in the world. Colombia's biggest highlight is in coal, where the country was, in 2018, the world's 12th largest producer and the 5th largest exporter. In renewable energies, in 2020, the country ranked 45th in the world in terms of installed wind energy (0.5 GW), 76th in the world in terms of installed solar energy (0.1 GW) and 20th in the world in terms of installed hydroelectric power (12.6 GW).

Venezuela, which was one of the world's largest oil producers (about 2.5 million barrels/day in 2015) and one of the largest exporters, due to its political problems, has had its production drastically reduced in recent years: in 2016, it dropped to 2.2 million, in 2017 to 2 million, in 2018 to 1.4 million and in 2019 to 877 thousand, reaching only 300,000 barrels/day at a given point. The country also stands out in hydroelectricity, where it was the 14th country in the world in terms of installed capacity in 2020 (16,5 GW).

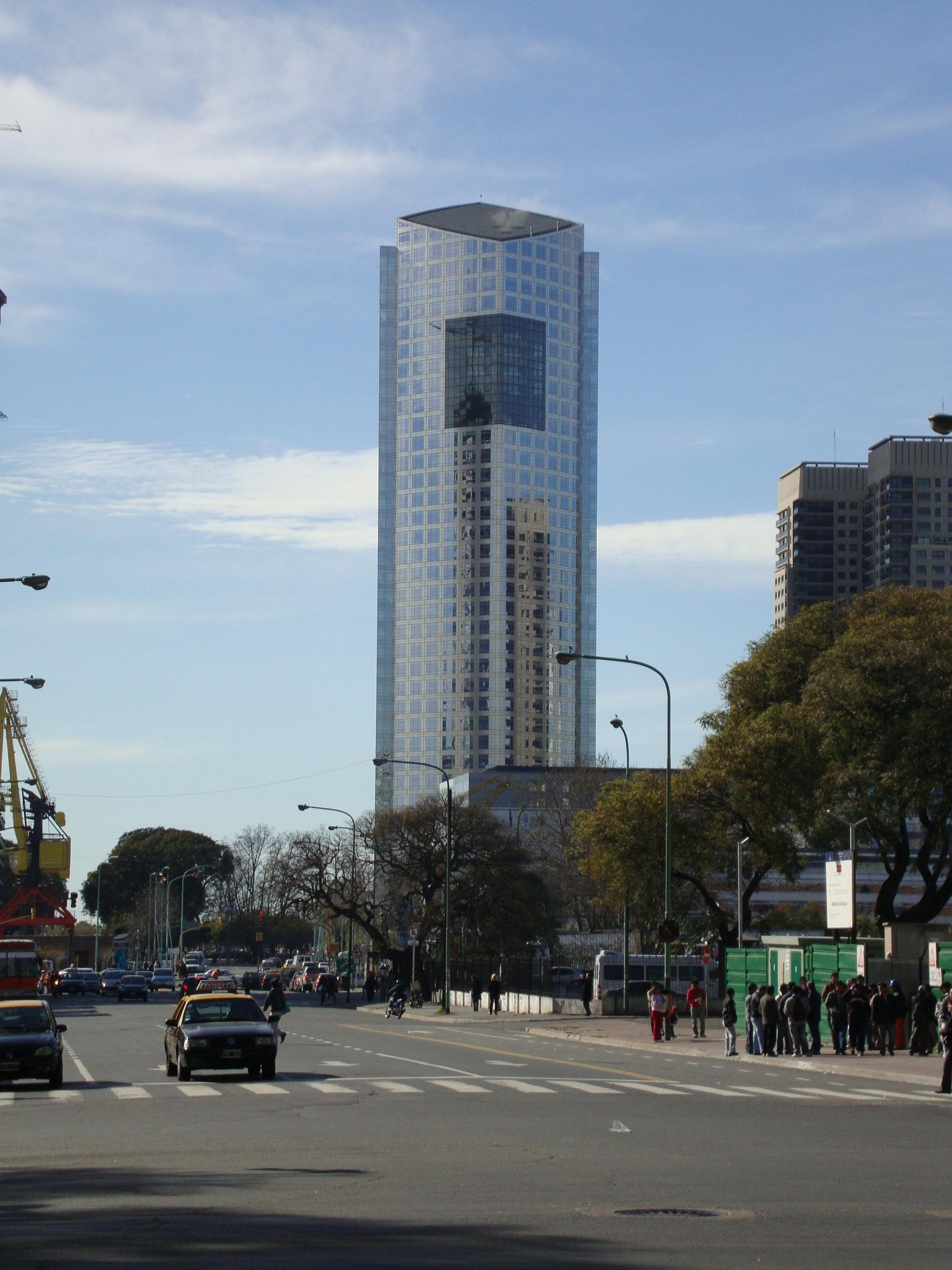
YPF headquarters in Buenos Aires, Argentina.

Argentina was, in 2017, the 18th largest producer in the world, and the largest producer in Latin America, of natural gas, in addition to being the 28th largest oil producer; although the country has the Vaca Muerta field, which holds close to 16 billion barrels of technically recoverable shale oil, and is the second largest shale natural gas deposit in the world, the country lacks the capacity to exploit the deposit: it is necessary capital, technology and knowledge that can only come from offshore energy companies, who view Argentina and its erratic economic policies with considerable suspicion, not wanting to invest in the country. In renewable energies, in 2020, the country ranked 27th in the world in terms of installed wind energy (2.6 GW), 42nd in the world in terms of installed solar energy (0.7 GW) and 21st in the world in terms of installed hydroelectric power (11.3 GW). The country has great future potential for the production of wind energy in the Patagonia region. Chile, although currently not a major energy producer, has great future potential for solar energy production in the Atacama Desert region.

Paraguay stands out today in hydroelectric production thanks to the Itaipu Power Plant. Trinidad and Tobago and Bolivia stand out in the production of natural gas, where they were, respectively, the 20th and 31st largest in the world in 2015. Ecuador, because it consumes little energy, is part of OPEC and was the 27th largest oil producer in the world in 2020, being the 22nd largest exporter in 2014.

=== Tourism ===
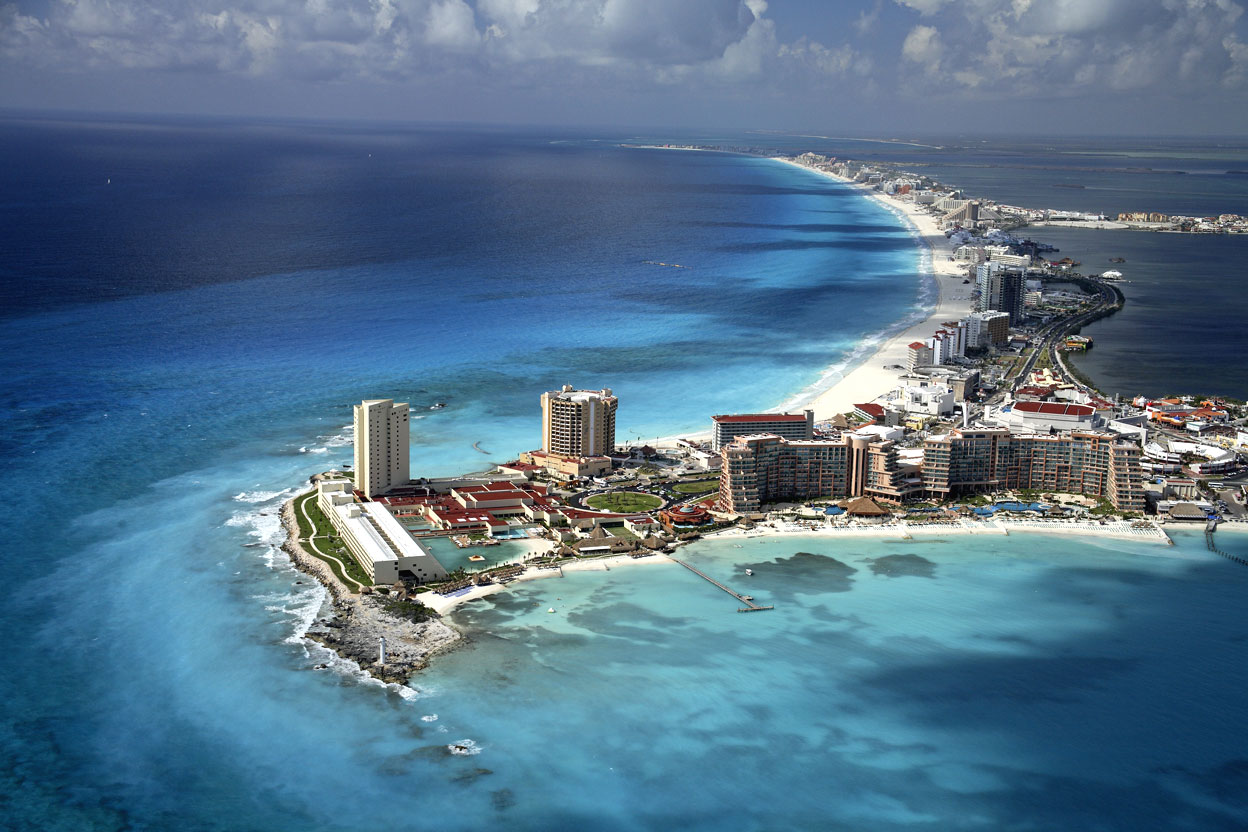
Aerial view of Cancún. Mexico is the most visited country in Latin America and 6th in the world.

Income from tourism is key to the economy of several Latin American countries. Mexico is the only Latin American country to be ranked in the top 10 worldwide in the number of tourist visits. It received by far the largest number of international tourists, with 39.3 million visitors in 2017, followed by Argentina, with 6.7 million; then Brazil, with 6.6 million; Chile, with 6.5 million; Dominican Republic, with 6.2 million; Cuba with 4.3 million; Peru and Colombia with 4.0 million. The World Tourism Organization reports the following destinations as the top six tourism earners for the year 2017: Mexico, with US$21,333 million; the Dominican Republic, with US$7,178 million; Brazil, with US$6,024 million; Colombia, with US$4,773 million; Argentina, with US$4,687 million; and Panama, with US$4,258 million.

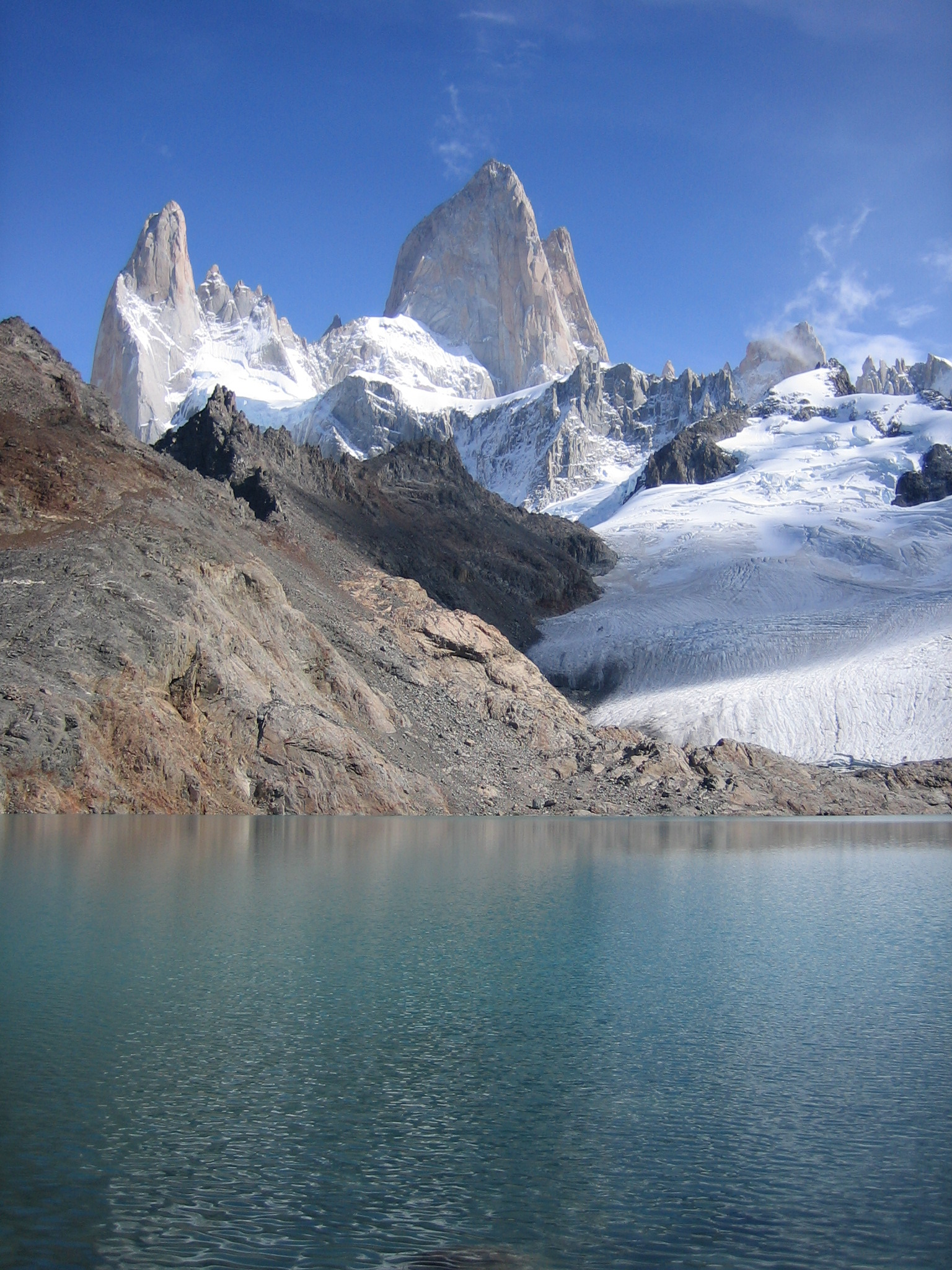
Monte Fitz Roy, Argentine Patagonia

Places such as Cancún, Riviera Maya, Chichen Itza, Cabo San Lucas, Mexico City, Acapulco, Puerto Vallarta, Guanajuato City, San Miguel de Allende, Guadalajara in Mexico, Punta Cana, Santo Domingo in Dominican Republic, Punta del Este in Uruguay, San Juan, Ponce in Puerto Rico, Panama City in Panama, Poás Volcano National Park in Costa Rica, Viña del Mar in Chile, Rio de Janeiro, Florianópolis, Iguazu Falls, São Paulo, Armação dos Búzios, Salvador, Bombinhas, Angra dos Reis, Balneário Camboriú, Paraty, Ipojuca, Natal, Cairu, Fortaleza and Itapema in Brazil; Buenos Aires, Bariloche, Salta, Jujuy, Perito Moreno Glacier, Valdes Peninsula, Guarani Jesuit Missions in the cities of Misiones and Corrientes, Ischigualasto Provincial Park, Ushuaia and Patagonia in Argentina; Isla Margarita, Angel Falls, Los Roques archipelago, Gran Sabana in Venezuela; Machu Picchu, Lima, Nazca Lines, Cuzco in Peru; Lake Titicaca, Salar de Uyuni, La Paz, Jesuit Missions of Chiquitos in Bolivia; Tayrona National Natural Park, Santa Marta, Bogotá, Cali, Medellín, Cartagena, San Andrés in Colombia, and the Galápagos Islands in Ecuador are popular among international visitors in the region.

=== Trade blocs ===
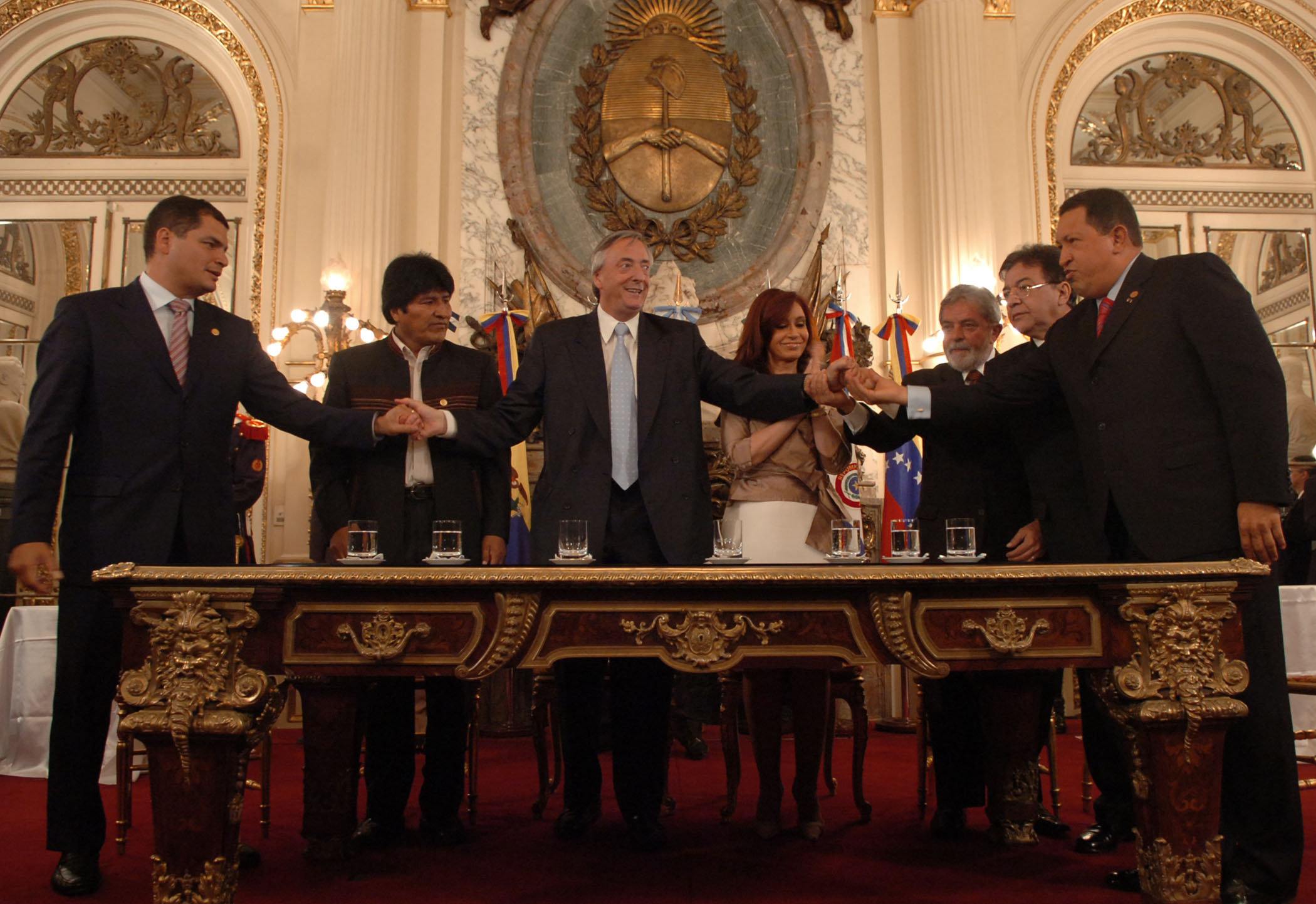
Rafael Correa, Evo Morales, Néstor Kirchner, Cristina Fernández, Luiz Inácio Lula da Silva, Nicanor Duarte, and Hugo Chávez at the signing of the founding charter of the Bank of the South

The major trade blocs (or agreements) in the region are the Pacific Alliance and Mercosur. Minor blocs or trade agreements are the G3 Free Trade Agreement, the Dominican Republic – Central America Free Trade Agreement (DR-CAFTA), the Caribbean Community (CARICOM) and the Andean Community of Nations (CAN). However, major reconfigurations are taking place along opposing approaches to integration and trade; Venezuela has officially withdrawn from both the CAN and G3 and it has been formally admitted into the Mercosur (pending ratification from the Paraguayan legislature). The president-elect of Ecuador has manifested his intentions of following the same path. This bloc nominally opposes any Free Trade Agreement (FTA) with the United States, although Uruguay has manifested its intention otherwise. Chile, Peru, Colombia and Mexico are the only four Latin American nations that have an FTA with the United States and Canada, both members of the North American Free Trade Agreement (NAFTA).

==== China ====
China's economic influence in Latin America increased substantially in the 21st century. Imports from China valued $8.3 billion in 2000, but by 2022 its value was $450 billion and had grown to be the largest trading partner of South America, as well as the second-largest for the broader Latin America. In particular, many of the investments are related to the Belt and Road Initiative or energy. China has also provided loans to several Latin American countries; this has raised concerns about the possibility of debt traps." Specifically, Venezuela, Brazil, Ecuador, and Argentina received the most loans from China during 2005–2016.

== Inequality ==
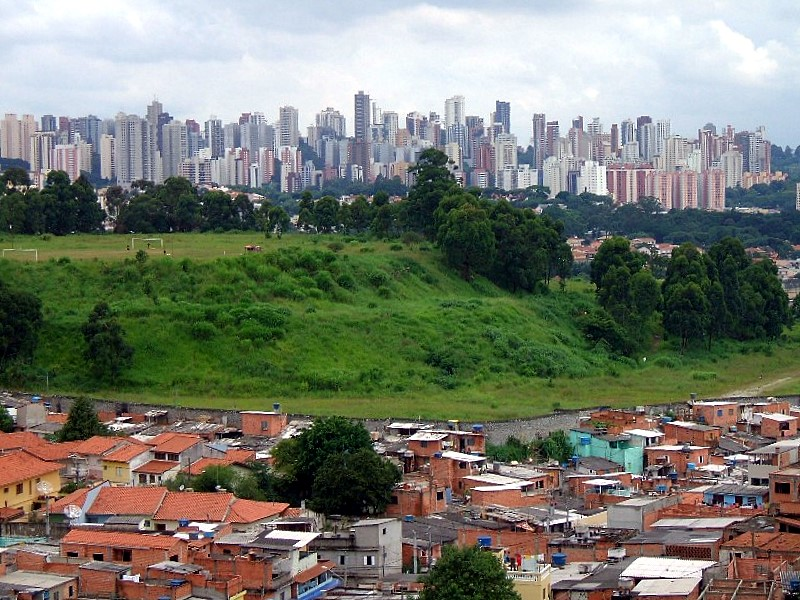
Slums on the outskirts of a wealthy urban area in São Paulo, Brazil.

Wealth inequality in Latin America remains a serious issue despite strong economic growth and improved social indicators. A report released in 2013 by the UN Department of Economic and Social Affairs entitled Inequality Matters: Report of the World Social Situation, observed that: 'Declines in the wage share have been attributed to the impact of labour-saving technological change and to a general weakening of labour market regulations and institutions.' Such declines are likely to disproportionately affect individuals in the middle and bottom of the income distribution, as they rely mostly on wages for income. In addition, the report noted that 'highly-unequal land distribution has created social and political tensions and is a source of economic inefficiency, as small landholders frequently lack access to credit and other resources to increase productivity, while big owners may not have had enough incentive to do so.

According to the United Nations ECLAC, Latin America is the most unequal region in the world. In 2025, The Economist said that Latin America's "tax and welfare systems are shockingly bad at reducing inequality."

=== History of inequality ===
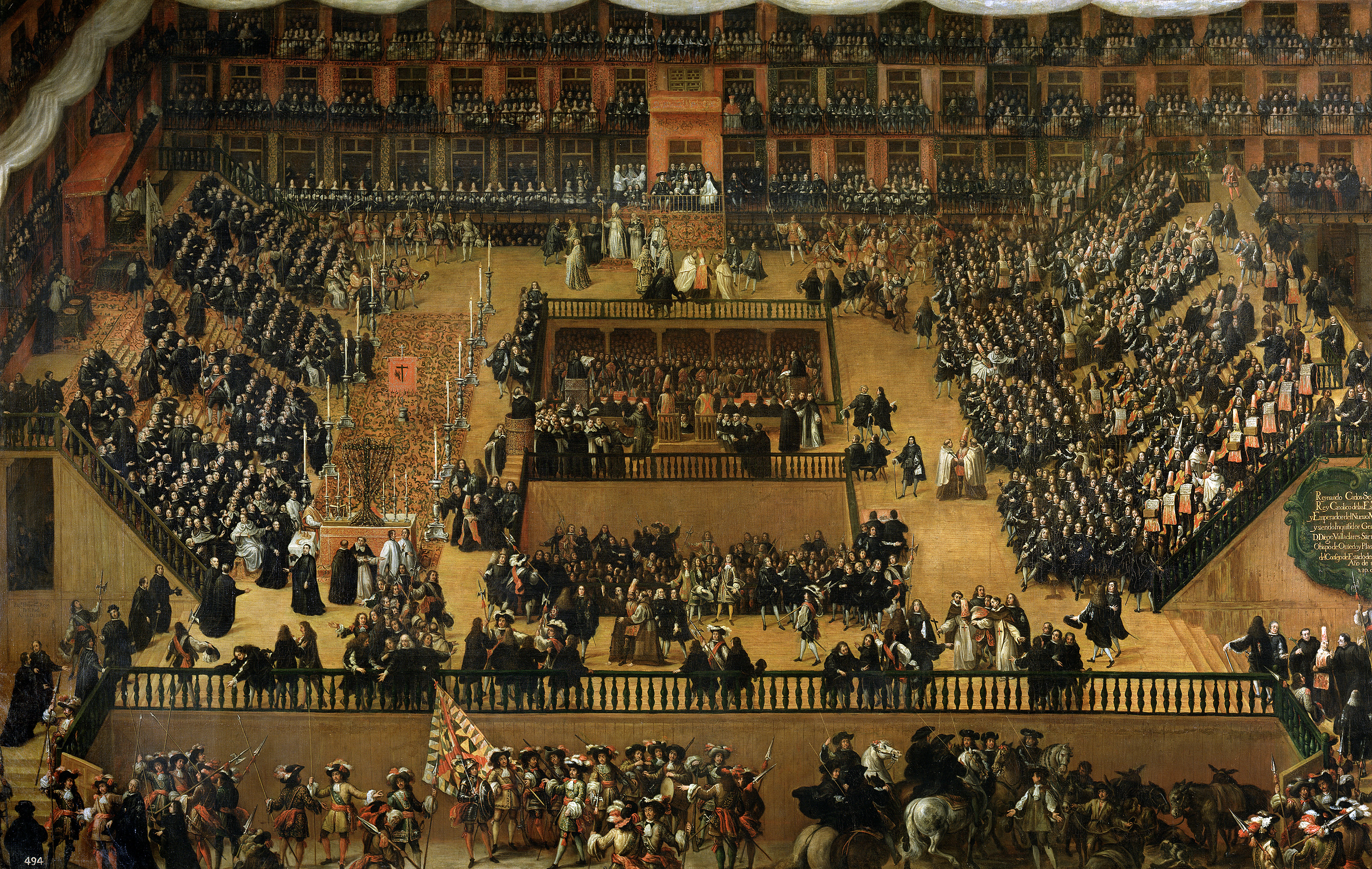
Spanish Inquisition's auto-da-fé held in the Plaza Mayor, Madrid in 1680

Spanish society in 17th century Habsburg Spain was extremely inegalitarian. The nobility, being wealthier than ordinary people, also had the privilege of being exempt from taxes. Spanish society associated social status with leisure and thus work was undignified for nobles. Even wealthy merchants invested in land, titles, and juros. Two acceptable careers for the nobility were the church and education. In 1620, there were 100,000 Spaniards in the clergy, by the late 17th century there were 150,000. Many Spaniards spent long years in universities, taking advantage of the increase in its numbers. By 1660, there were about 200,000 Spaniards in the clergy and the Church owned 20% of all the land in Spain.

Inequality in Latin America has deep historical roots in the Latin European racially based Casta system instituted in Latin America during colonial times that has been difficult to eradicate because of the differences between initial endowments and opportunities among social groups have constrained the poorest's social mobility, thus causing poverty to transmit from generation to generation, and become a vicious cycle. Inequality has been reproduced and transmitted through generations because Latin American political systems allow a differentiated access on the influence that social groups have in the decision-making process, and it responds in different ways to the least favored groups that have less political representation and capacity of pressure. Recent economic liberalisation also plays a role as not everyone is equally capable of taking advantage of its benefits. Differences in opportunities and endowments tend to be based on race, ethnicity, rurality, and gender. Because inequality in gender and location are near-universal, race and ethnicity play a larger, more integral role in discriminatory practices in Latin America. The differences have a strong impact on the distribution of income, capital and political standing.

One indicator of inequality is access to and quality of education. During the first phase of globalization in Latin America, educational inequality was on the rise, peaking around the end of the 19th century. In comparison with other developing regions, Latin America then had the highest level of educational inequality, which is certainly a contributing factor for its current general high inequality. During the 20th century, however, educational inequality started decreasing.

=== Standard of living ===
Latin America has the highest levels of income inequality in the world. The following table lists all the countries in Latin America indicating a valuation of the country's Human Development Index, GDP at purchasing power parity per capita, measurement of inequality through the Gini index, measurement of poverty through the Human Poverty Index, a measure of extreme poverty based on people living on less than 1.25 dollars a day, life expectancy, murder rates and a measurement of safety through the Global Peace Index. Green cells indicate the best performance in each category, and red the lowest.

Social and economic indicators for Latin American countries
Country	HDI (2023)	GDP (PPP) per capita in US$ (2025)	Real GDP growth (2025)	Income inequality (2015)	Extreme poverty% <1.25 US$ (2011)	Youth literacy% (2015)	Life expectancy (2016)	Murder rate per 100,000 (2014)	Peace GPI (2016)
Argentina	0.865 (VH)	20,170	4.5	43.6	0.9	99.2	78	6	1.957
Bolivia	0.733 (H)	11,574	0.6	46.6	14.0	99.4	70	12 ^{(2012)}	2.038
Brazil	0.786 (H)	23,239	2.4	52.7	0.9	97.5	70	29	2.176
Chile	0.878 (VH)	35,286	2.5	50.8	0.8	98.9	79	4	1.635
Colombia	0.788 (H)	22,421	2.5	52.2	8.2	98.2	76	28	2.764
Costa Rica	0.833 (VH)	31,485	3.6	48.6	0.7	98.3	79	10	1.699
Cuba	0.762 (H)	—N/a	—N/a	—N/a	—N/a	100.0	79		2.057
Dominican Republic	0.776 (H)	30,538	3.0	45.7	4.3	97.0	78	17	2.143
Ecuador	0.777 (H)	16,578	3.2	46.6	5.1	98.7	77	8	2.020
El Salvador	0.678 (M)	13,753	2.5	41.8	15.1	96.0	75	64	2.237
Guatemala	0.662 (M)	15,634	3.8	52.4	16.9	87.4	72	31	2.270
Honduras	0.645 (M)	7,927	3.8	57.4	23.3	95.9	71	75	2.237
Mexico	0.789 (H)	25,463	1.0	48.1	8.4	98.5	77	16	2.557
Nicaragua	0.706 (H)	9,107	3.0	45.7	15.8	87.0	73	8 ^{(2019)}	1.975
Panama	0.839 (VH)	43,651	4.0	51.9	9.5	97.6	79	18 ^{(2012)}	1.837
Paraguay	0.756 (H)	19,571	4.4	48.0	5.1	98.6	77	9	2.037
Peru	0.794 (H)	18,689	2.9	45.3	5.9	97.4	74	7	2.057
Uruguay	0.862 (VH)	37,190	2.5	41.3	0.0	98.8	77	8	1.726
Venezuela	0.709 (H)	8,397	0.5	44.8	3.5	98.5	75	62	2.651

== Demographics ==
Historical populations
Year	Pop.	±% p.a.
1750	16,000,000	—
1800	24,000,000	+0.81%
1850	38,000,000	+0.92%
1900	74,000,000	+1.34%
1950	167,000,000	+1.64%
2001	511,000,000	+2.22%
2013	603,191,486	+1.39%
Source: "UN report 2004 data" (PDF)

=== Largest cities ===
Latin American cities

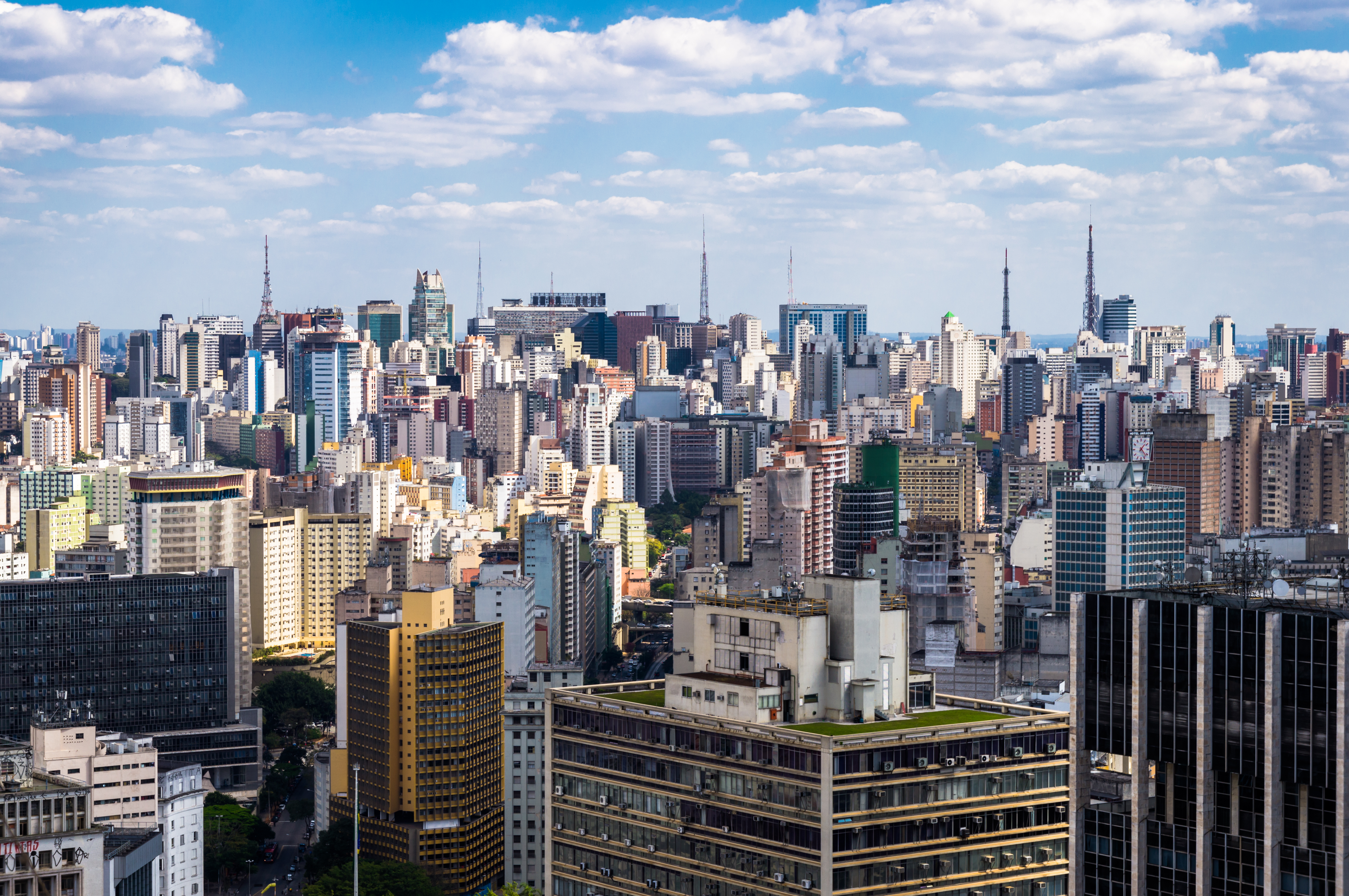
São Paulo

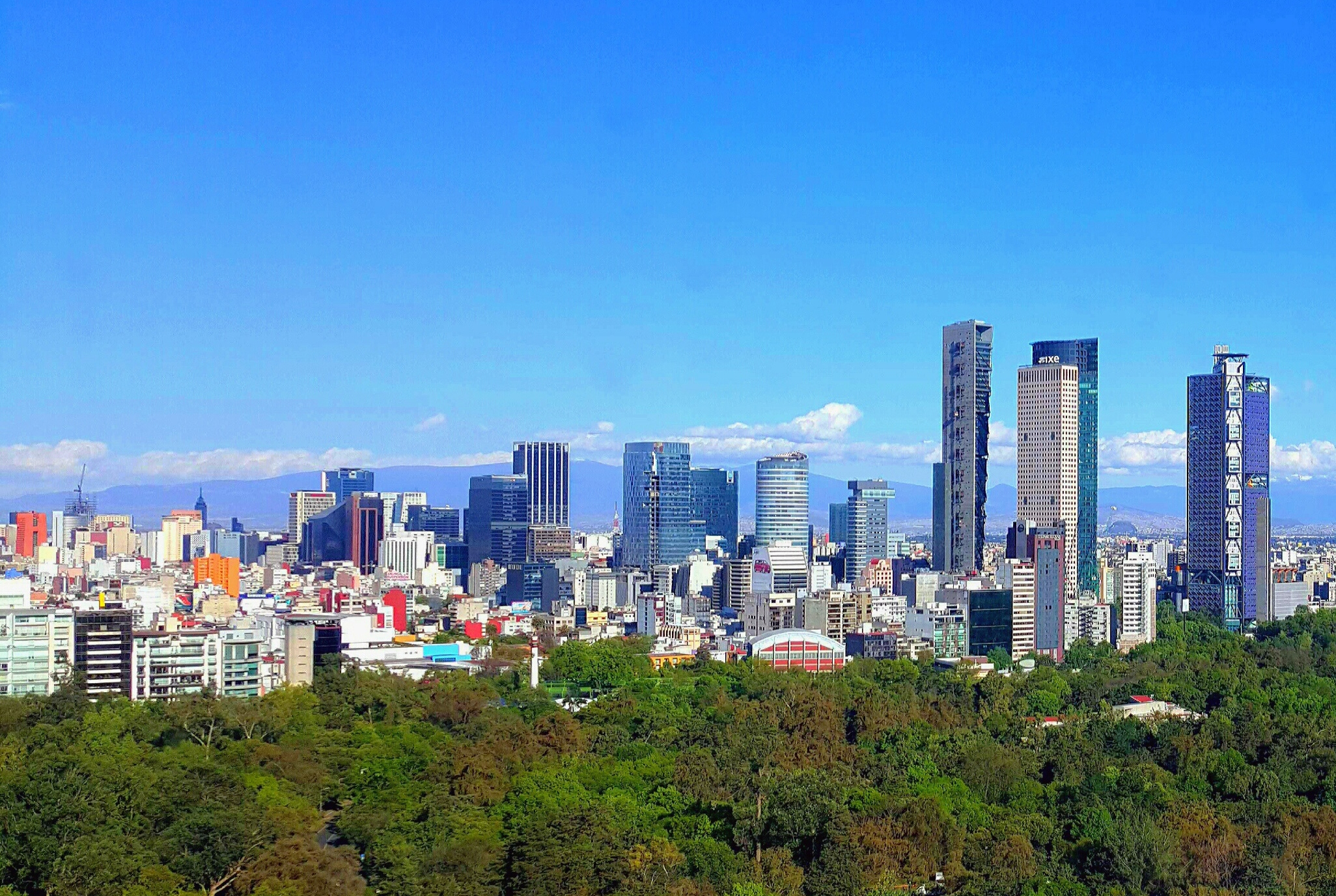
Mexico City

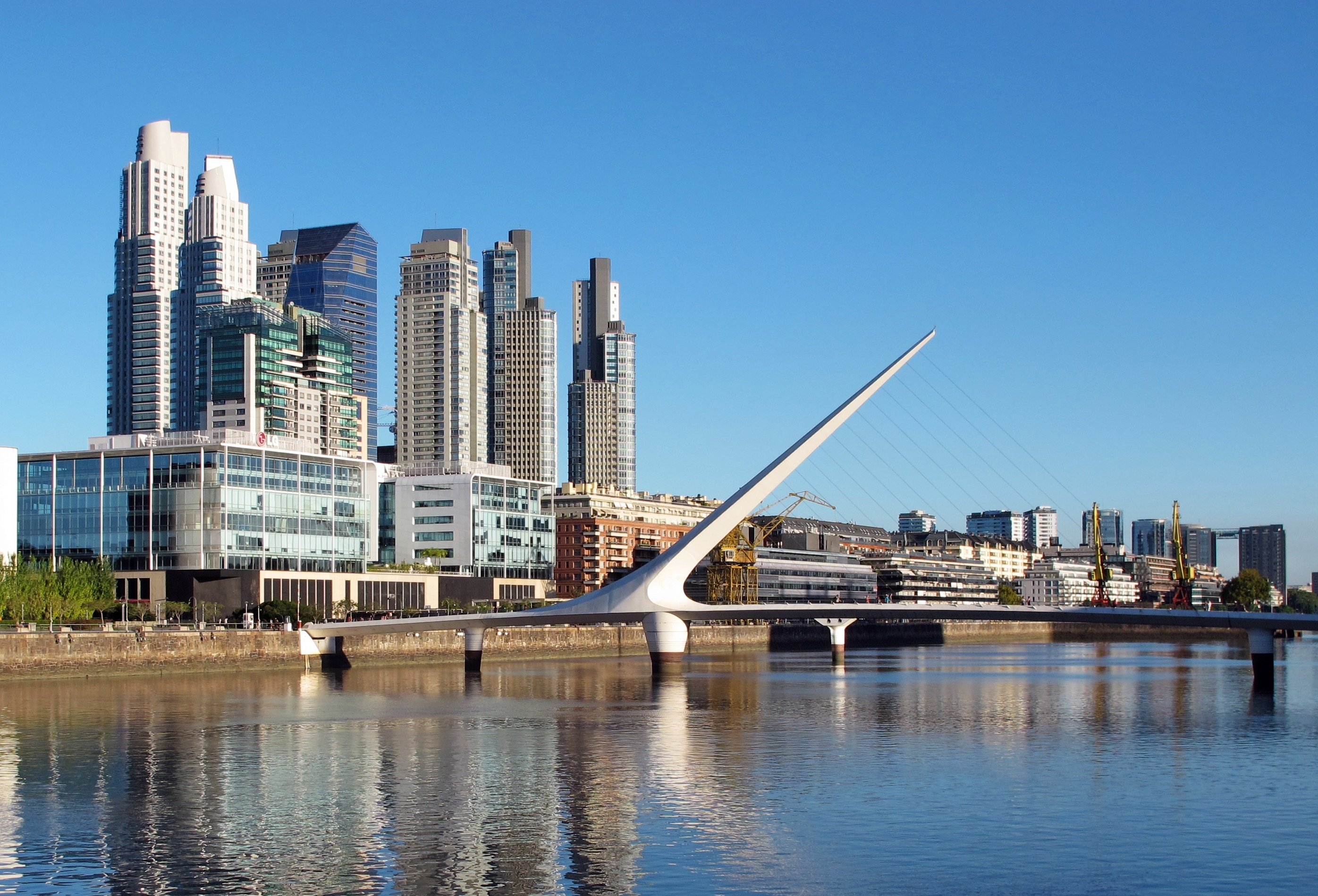
Buenos Aires

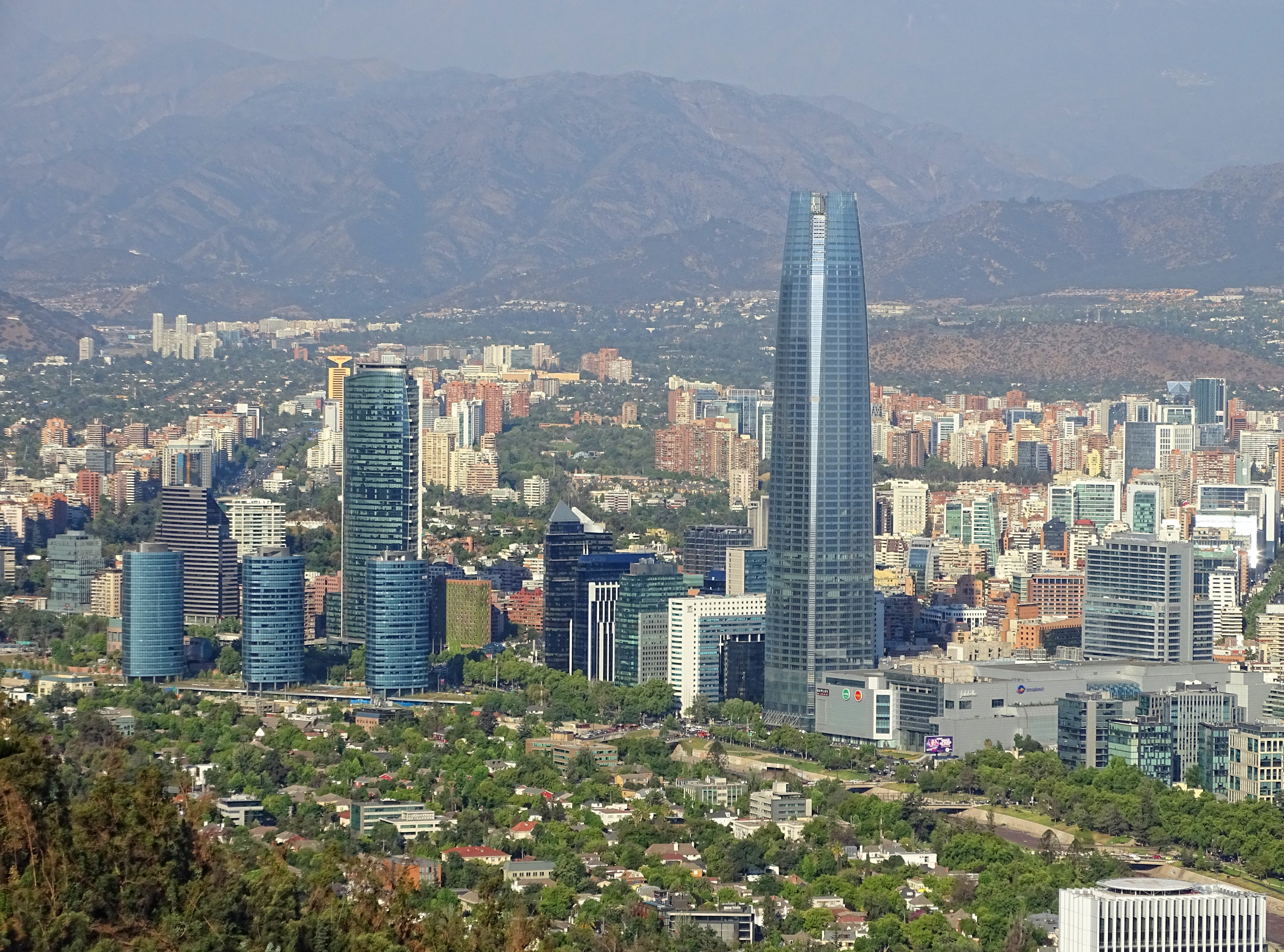
Santiago

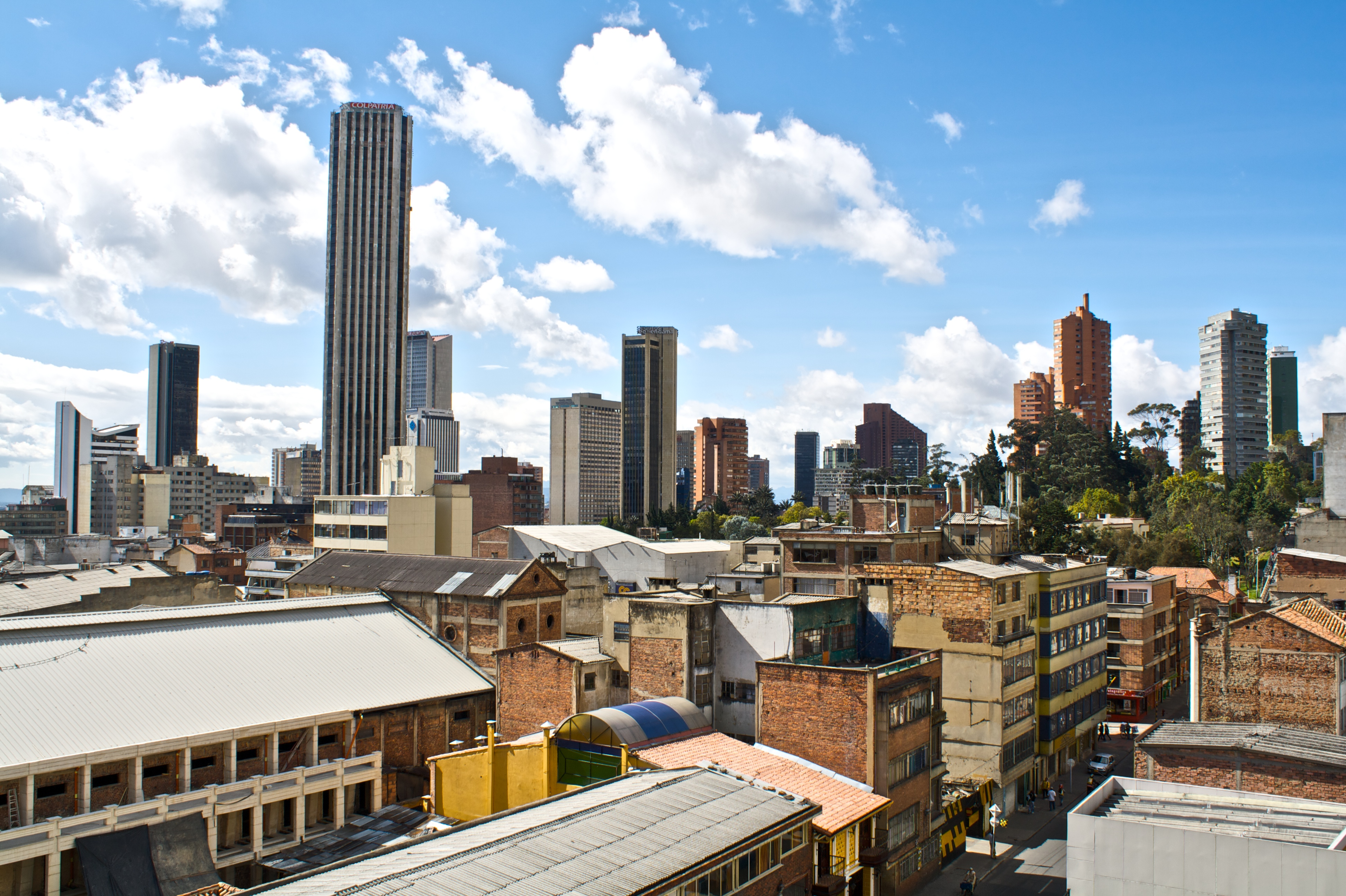
Bogotá

Urbanization accelerated starting in the mid-twentieth century, especially in capital cities, or in the case of Brazil, traditional economic and political hubs founded in the colonial era. In Mexico, the rapid growth and modernization in country's north has seen the growth of Monterrey, in Nuevo León. The following is a list of the ten largest metropolitan areas in Latin America. Entries in "bold" indicate they are ranked the highest.

City	Country	Population 2017	2014 GDP (PPP, $million, USD)	2014 GDP per capita (PPP, USD)
Mexico City	Mexico	23,655,355	403,561	$19,239
São Paulo	Brazil	23,467,354	430,510	$20,650
Buenos Aires	Argentina	15,564,354	315,885	$23,606
Rio de Janeiro	Brazil	14,440,345	176,630	$14,176
Lima	Peru	9,804,609	176,447	$16,530
Bogotá	Colombia	7,337,449	209,150	$19,497
Santiago	Chile	7,164,400	171,436	$23,290
Belo Horizonte	Brazil	6,145,800	95,686	$17,635
Guadalajara	Mexico	4,687,700	80,656	$17,206
Monterrey	Mexico	4,344,200	122,896	$28,290

=== Race and ethnicity ===
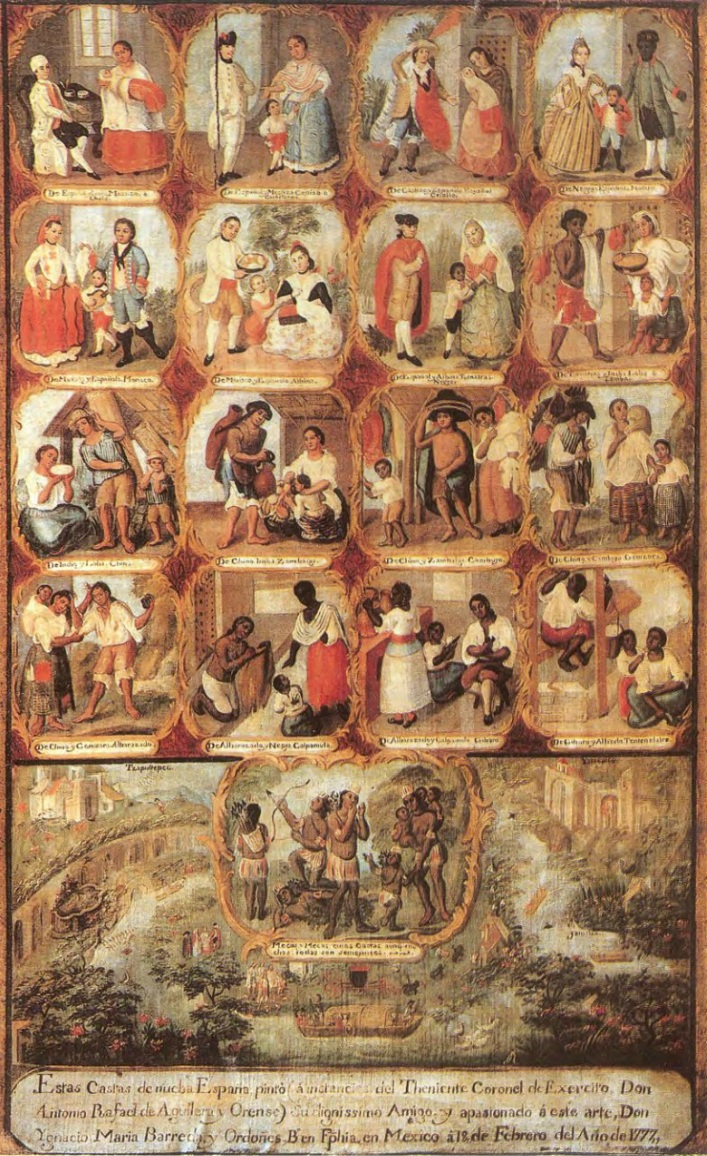
Eighteenth-century Mexican Casta painting showing 16 castas hierarchically arranged. Ignacio Maria Barreda, 1777. Real Academia Española de la Lengua, Madrid.

Latin American populations are diverse, with descendants of the Indigenous peoples, Europeans, Africans initially brought as slaves, and Asians, as well as new immigrants.

Mixing of groups was a fact of life at contact of the Old World and the New, but colonial regimes established legal and social discrimination against non-white populations simply on the basis of perceived ethnicity and skin color. Social class was usually linked to a person's racial category, with European-born Spaniards and Portuguese on top. During the colonial era, with a dearth initially of European women, European men and Indigenous women and African women produced what were considered mixed-race children. In Spanish America, the so-called Sociedad de castas or Sistema de castas was constructed by white elites to try to rationalize the processes at work. In the sixteenth century the Spanish crown sought to protect Indigenous populations from exploitation by white elites for their labor and land. The crown created the República de indios to paternalistically govern and protect Indigenous peoples. It also created the República de Españoles, which included not only European whites, but all non-Indigenous peoples, such as Black, mulattoes, and mixed-race castas who were not dwelling in Indigenous communities. In the religious sphere, the Indigenous were deemed perpetual neophytes in the Catholic faith, which meant Indigenous men were not eligible to be ordained as Catholic priests; however, Indigenous were also excluded from the jurisdiction of the Inquisition. Catholics saw military conquest and religious conquest as two parts of the assimilation of Indigenous populations, suppressing Indigenous religious practices and eliminating the Indigenous priesthood. Some worship continued underground. Jews and other non-Catholics, such as Protestants (all called "Lutherans") were banned from settling and were subject to the Inquisition.

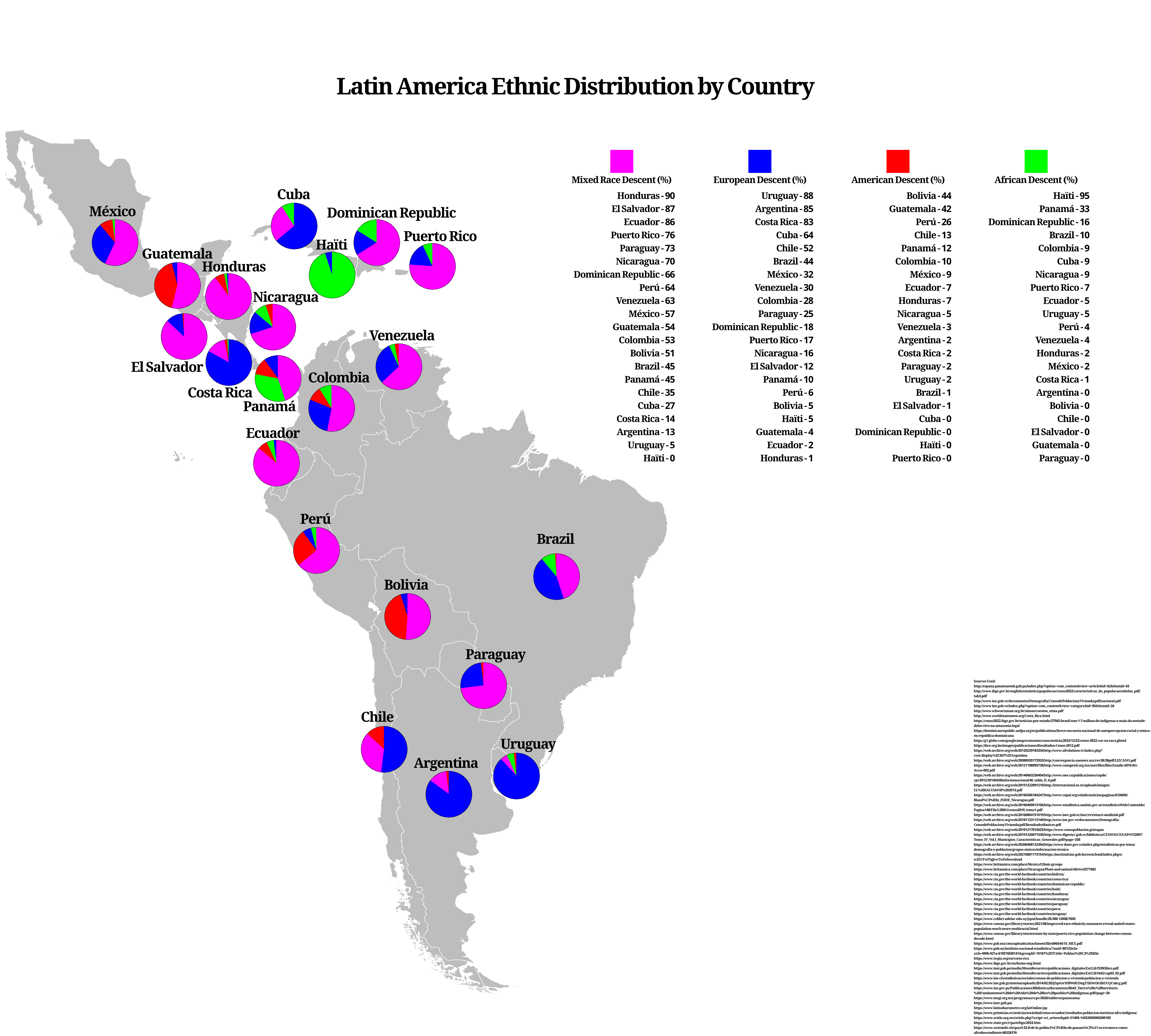
Map of ethno-racial distribution by country.

Considerable mixing of populations occurred in cities, while the countryside was largely Indigenous. At independence in the early nineteenth century, in many places in Spanish America formal racial and legal distinctions disappeared, although slavery was not uniformly abolished. Significant black populations exist in Brazil and Spanish Caribbean islands such as Cuba and Puerto Rico and the circum-Caribbean mainland (Venezuela, Colombia, Panama), as long as in the southern part of South America and Central America (Honduras, Costa Rica, Nicaragua, Ecuador, and Peru) a legacy of their use in plantations. All these areas also have significant white populations. In Brazil, coastal Indigenous peoples largely died out in the early sixteenth century, with Indigenous populations surviving far from cities, sugar plantations, and other European enterprises. Many mixed-race people in much of Latin America are tri-racial, usually of European, African, and Indigenous blood, where European (mostly Spanish/Portuguese) tends to be the strongest of the three. In most of Brazil and the Spanish Caribbean, the average ancestral mix is European and African blood, with much smaller amounts of indigenous blood. While the opposite is true in many mainland Spanish-speaking Latin American countries like Venezuela, Colombia, and Panama, where the average ancestral mix is of European and indigenous blood, with smaller amounts of African. But in Mexico, and other places in northern Central America and southern South America, mixed race people tend to be completely of European and indigenous blood.

Dominican Republic, Puerto Rico, Cuba, and Brazil have dominant Mulatto/Triracial populations ("Pardo" in Brazil). More specifically, in Brazil and Cuba, there is equally large white populations and smaller black populations, while Dominican Republic and Puerto Rico are more Mulatto/Triracial dominated, with significant black and white minorities. Parts of Central America and northern South America are more diverse in that they are predominantly made up of Mestizos and Whites but also have large numbers of Mulattos, Black, and Indigenous people, especially Colombia, Venezuela, and Panama.

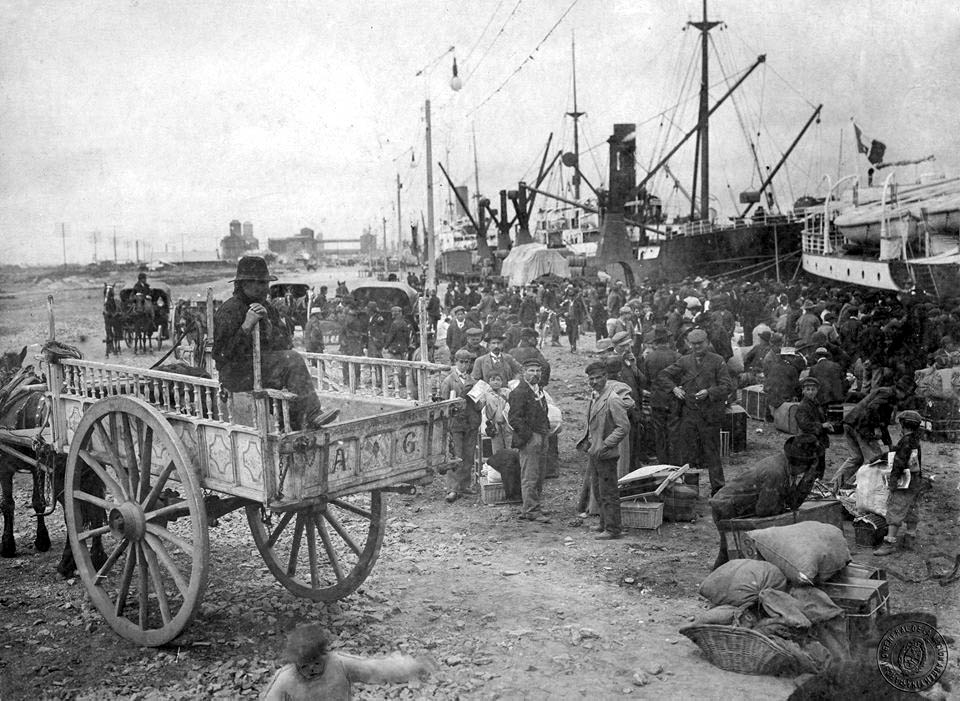
Italian immigrants arriving in Buenos Aires, during the great European immigration wave to Argentina.

The Southern Cone region—encompassing Argentina, Uruguay, and Chile—is predominantly White due to the massive European immigration that occurred from the late 19th century to the mid-20th century. The rest of Latin America, including Mexico, northern Central America—Guatemala, El Salvador, Honduras— and central South America—Peru, Ecuador, Bolivia, Paraguay—are dominated by mestizos but also have large white and indigenous minorities. Black people make up the majority of the French Caribbean, but it is generally not considered part of Latin America. In the nineteenth century, a number of Latin American countries sought immigrants from Europe and Asia. With the abolition of black slavery in 1888, the Brazilian monarchy fell in 1889. By then, another source of cheap labor to work on coffee plantations was found in Japan. Chinese male immigrants arrived in Cuba, Mexico, Peru and elsewhere. With political turmoil in Europe during the mid-nineteenth century and widespread poverty, Germans, Spaniards, and Italians immigrated to Latin America in large numbers, welcomed by Latin American governments both as a source of labor as well as a way to increase the size of their white populations. In Argentina, many Afro-Argentines married Euro-Argentines.

In twentieth-century Brazil, sociologist Gilberto Freyre proposed that Brazil was a "racial democracy", with less discrimination against black people than in the United States. Even if a system of legal racial segregation was never implemented in Latin America, unlike the United States, subsequent research has shown that in Brazil there's discrimination against darker citizens, and that whites remain the elites in the country. In Mexico, the mestizo population was considered the true embodiment of "the cosmic race", according to Mexican intellectual José Vasconcelos, thus erasing other populations. There was considerable discrimination against Asians, with calls for the expulsion of Chinese in northern Mexico during the Mexican Revolution (1910–1920) and racially motivated massacres. In a number of Latin American countries, Indigenous groups have organized explicitly as Indigenous, to claim human rights and influence political power. With the passage of anti-colonial resolutions in the United Nations General Assembly and the signing of resolutions for Indigenous rights, the Indigenous are able to act to guarantee their existence within nation-states with legal standing.

=== Ethnic groups ===
Ethnic Group	Year	
Ethnic Group	2022	
Ethnic Group	Number	%
South America	490,725,023	67.25%
Brazilians	221,000,000	30.29%
Argentinians	69,204,000	9.48%
Colombians	57,600,923	7.89%
Venezuelans	45,720,000	6.27%
Peruvians	34,102,000	4.67%
Chileans	27,829,000	3.81%
Ecuadorians	19,300,000	2.65%
Paraguayans	13,621,000	1.87%
Bolivians	12,391,000	1.70%
Uruguayans	7,103,000	0.97%
North America	131,194,976	17.98%
Mexicans	131,194,976	17.98%
Central America	51,519,730	7.06%
Guatemalans	17,141,463	2.35%
Nicaraguans	12,904,622	1.77%
Salvadorans	9,630,289	1.32%
Panamanians	7,762,736	1.06%
Costa Ricans	7,200,680	0.99%
Hondurans	4,763,940	0.65%
Caribbean	27,256,789	3.73%
Cubans	12,729,000	1.74%
Dominicans	12,706,605	1.74%
Puerto Ricans	1,821,184	0.25%
Indigenous People	11,860,350	1.63%
Aymarans	9,278,905	1.27%
Mapuche	2,672,499	0.37%
Others	7,231,086	0.99%
Total:	719,787,954	100%

=== Language ===
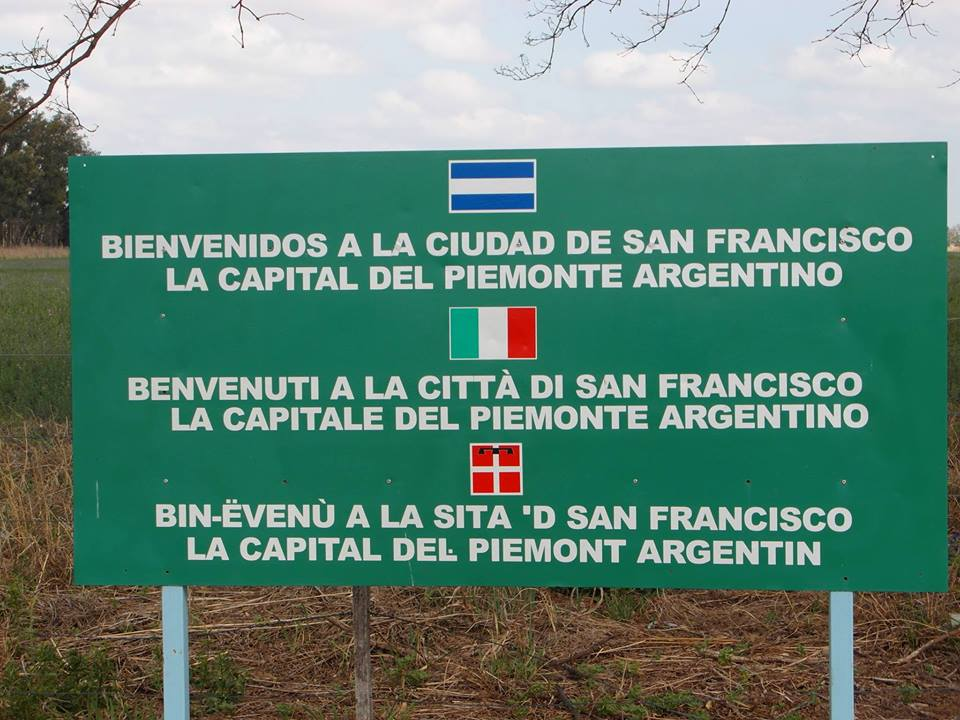
Trilingual sign in Spanish, Italian and Piedmontese in San Francisco, Córdoba Province, Argentina.

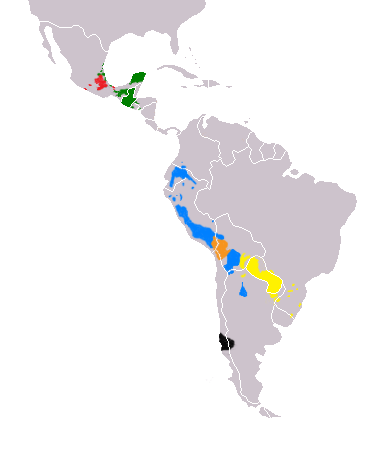
Most widely spoken Native languages in Latin America: Quechua, Guaraní, Aymara, Náhuatl, Mayan Languages, Mapudungun

Spanish is the predominant language of Latin America. It is spoken as a first language by about 60% of the population. Portuguese is spoken by about 30%, and about 10% speak other languages such as Quechua, Mayan languages, Guaraní, Aymara, Nahuatl, English, French, Dutch and Italian. Spanish is the official language of most of the countries and territories on the Latin American mainland, as well as in Cuba, Puerto Rico (where it is co-official with English), and the Dominican Republic. Portuguese is spoken mostly in Brazil, the largest and most populous country in the region. French is spoken in Haiti and in the French overseas departments of Guadeloupe, Martinique, and French Guiana. It is also spoken by some Panamanians of Afro-Antillean descent. Dutch is the official language in Suriname, Aruba, Curaçao and Bonaire. As Dutch is a Germanic language, the territories are not necessarily considered part of Latin America. However, the native and co-official language of Aruba, Bonaire, and Curaçao, is Papiamento, a creole language largely based on Portuguese and Spanish that has had a considerable influence from Dutch and other Portuguese-based creole languages.

Amerindian languages are widely spoken in Peru, Guatemala, Bolivia, Paraguay and Mexico, and to a lesser degree, in Panama, Ecuador, Brazil, Colombia, Venezuela, Argentina, and Chile. In other Latin American countries, the population of speakers of Indigenous languages tend to be very small or even non-existent, for example in Uruguay. Mexico is possibly contains more Indigenous languages than any other Latin American country, but the most-spoken Indigenous language there is Nahuatl.

In Peru, Quechua is an official language, alongside Spanish and other Indigenous languages in the areas where they predominate. In Ecuador, while Quichua holds no official status, it is a recognized language under the country's constitution; however, it is only spoken by a few groups in the country's highlands. In Bolivia, Aymara, Quechua, and Guaraní hold official status alongside Spanish. Guaraní, like Spanish, is an official language of Paraguay, and is spoken by a majority of the population, which is, for the most part, bilingual, and it is co-official with Spanish in the Argentine province of Corrientes. In Nicaragua, Spanish is the official language, but on the country's Caribbean coast English and Indigenous languages such as Miskito, Sumo, and Rama also hold official status. Colombia recognizes all Indigenous languages spoken within its territory as official, though fewer than 1% of its population are native speakers of these languages. Nahuatl is one of the 62 Native languages spoken by Indigenous people in Mexico, which are officially recognized by the government as "national languages" along with Spanish.

Other European languages spoken in Latin America include: English, by half of the current population in Puerto Rico, as well as in nearby countries that may or may not be considered Latin American, like Belize and Guyana, and spoken by descendants of British settlers in Argentina and Chile. German is spoken in southern Brazil, southern Chile, portions of Argentina, Venezuela and Paraguay; Italian in Brazil, Argentina, Venezuela, and Uruguay; Ukrainian, Polish, and Russian in southern Brazil and Argentina; and Welsh, in southern Argentina. Non-European or Asian languages include Japanese in Brazil, Peru, Bolivia, and Paraguay, Korean in Brazil, Argentina, Paraguay, and Chile, Arabic in Argentina, Brazil, Colombia, Venezuela, and Chile, and Chinese throughout South America. Countries like Venezuela, Argentina and Brazil have their own dialects or variations of German and Italian.

In several nations, especially in the Caribbean region, creole languages are spoken. The most widely-spoken creole language in the combined Latin America and the Caribbean region is Haitian Creole, the predominant language of Haiti, derived primarily from French and certain West African tongues, with Amerindian, English, Portuguese, and Spanish influences as well. Creole languages of mainland Latin America, similarly, are derived from European languages and various African tongues. The aforementioned Papiamento, commonly spoken on the Dutch Caribbean ABC Islands, is a Portuguese-based creole.

The Garifuna language is spoken along the Caribbean coast in Honduras, Guatemala, Nicaragua, and Belize, mostly by the Garifuna people, a mixed-race Zambo people who were the result of mixing between Indigenous Caribbeans and escaped Black slaves. Primarily an Arawakan language, it has influences from Caribbean and European languages.

Archaeologists have deciphered over 15 pre-Columbian distinct writing systems from Mesoamerican societies. Ancient Maya had the most sophisticated textually written language, but since texts were largely confined to the religious and administrative elite, traditions were passed down orally. Oral traditions also prevailed in other major Indigenous groups including, but not limited to, the Aztecs and other Nahuatl speakers, Quechua and Aymara of the Andean regions, the Quiché of Central America, the Tupi-Guaraní in today's Brazil, the Guaraní in Paraguay, and the Mapuche in Chile.

=== Religion ===
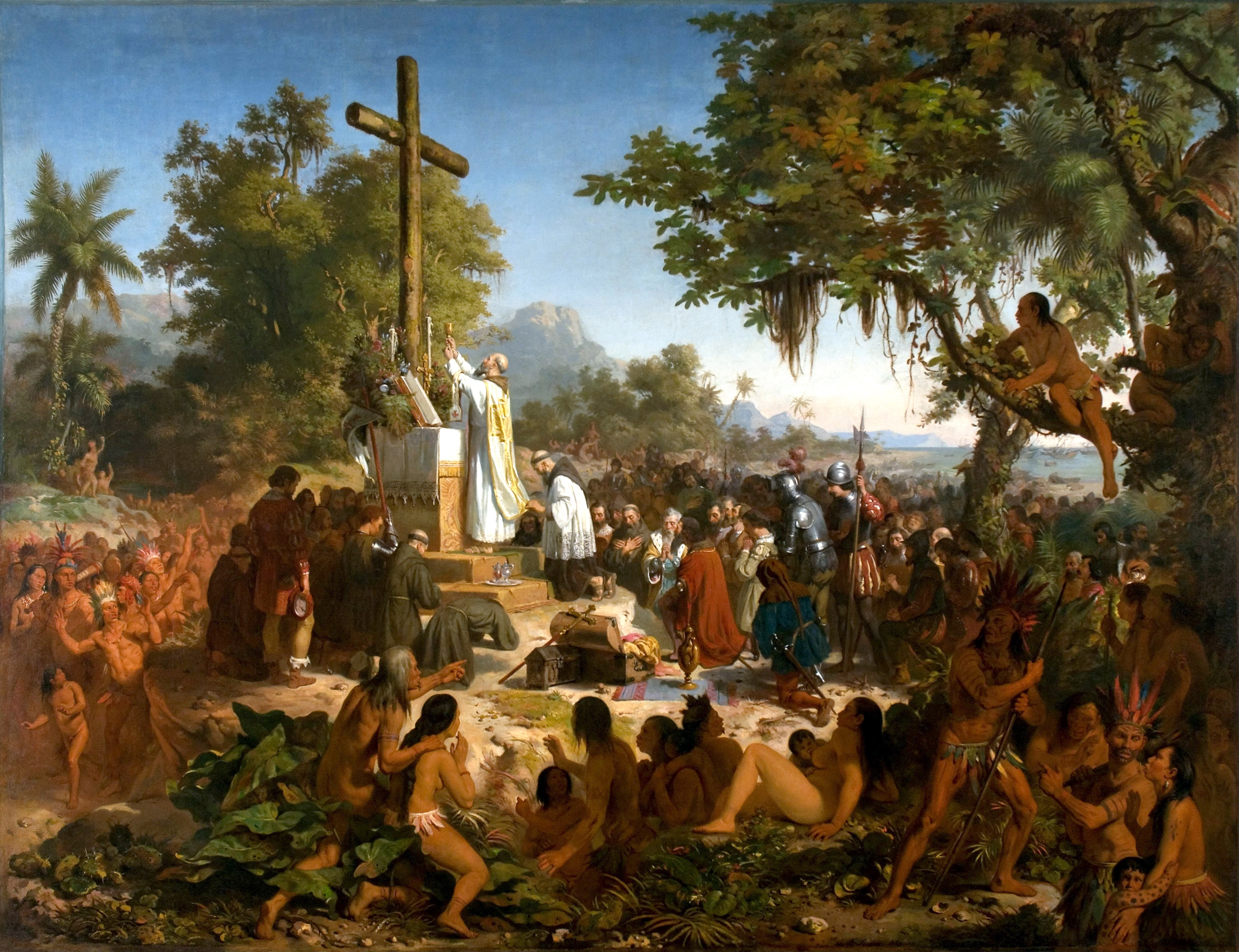
The first Mass in Brazil among the Native Brazilians on 26 April 1500. Painting by Victor Meirelles (1860).

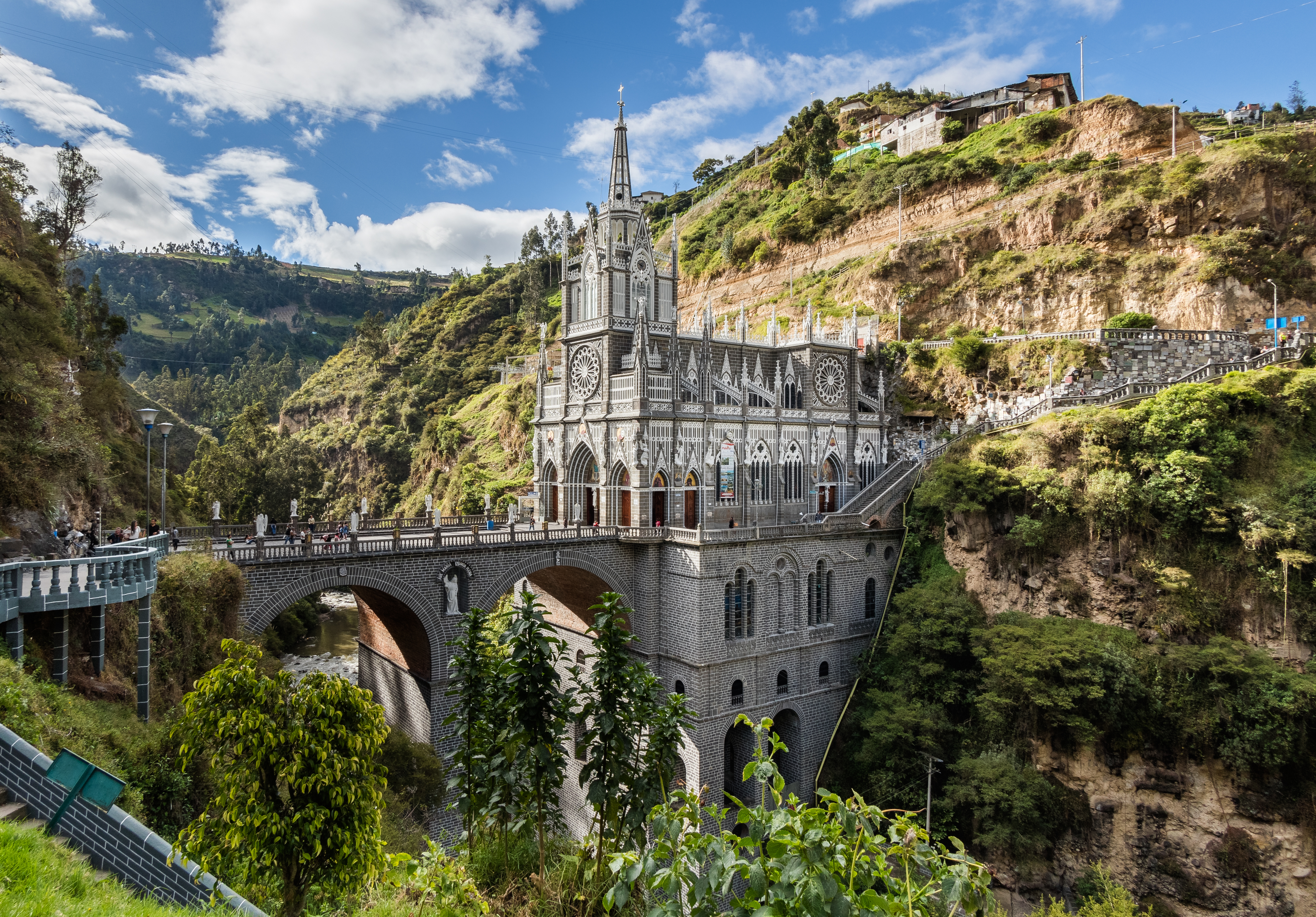
The Las Lajas Sanctuary in southern Colombia, Department of Nariño

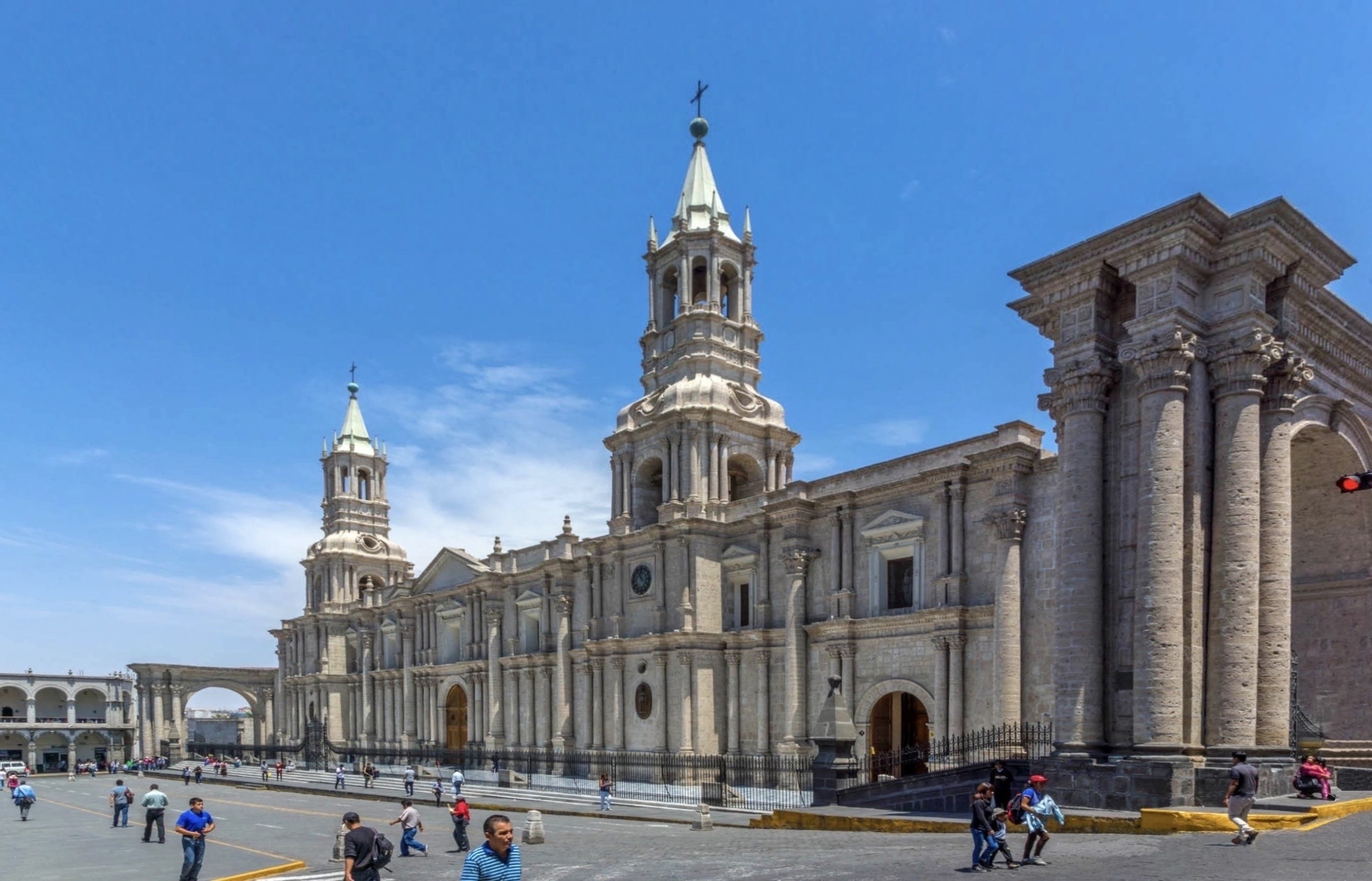
Cathedral of Arequipa, in Southern Peru

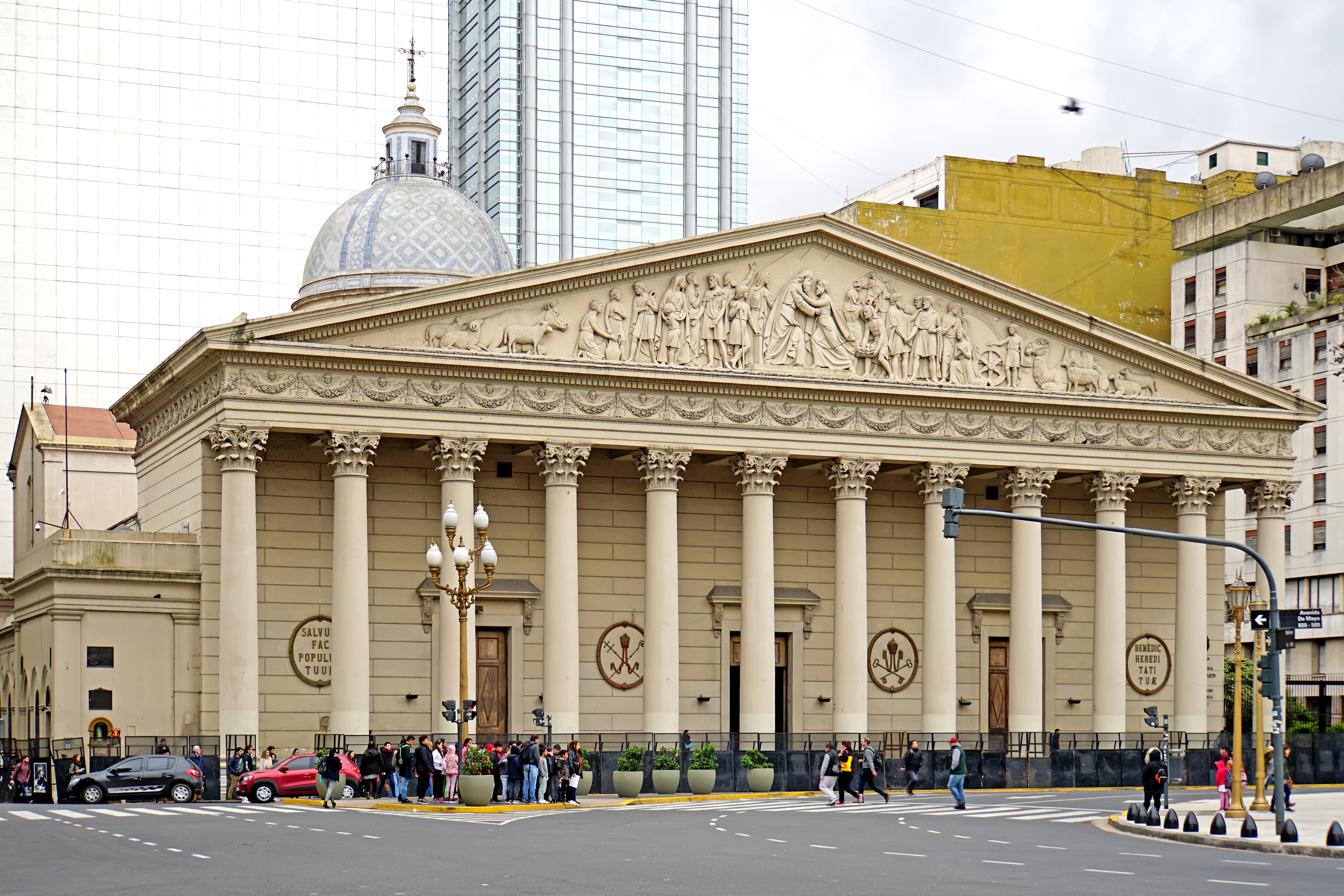
Buenos Aires Metropolitan Cathedral, where the remains of General José de San Martín lie, the Libertador of Argentina, Chile and Peru.

The vast majority of Latin Americans are Christians (90%), mostly Roman Catholics belonging to the Latin Church. About 70% of the Latin American population considers itself Catholic. In 2012 Latin America constitutes in absolute terms the second world's largest Christian population, after Europe.

According to the detailed Pew multi-country survey in 2014, 69% of the Latin American population is Catholic and 19% is Protestant. Protestants are 26% of the population in Brazil and over 40% in much of Central America. More than half of these are converts from Roman Catholicism.

Religion in Latin America (2014)
Country	Catholic	Protestant	Irreligion	Other
Paraguay	89%	7%	1%	2%
Mexico	81%	9%	7%	4%
Colombia	79%	13%	6%	2%
Ecuador	79%	13%	5%	3%
Bolivia	77%	16%	4%	3%
Peru	76%	17%	4%	3%
Venezuela	73%	17%	7%	4%
Argentina	71%	15%	12%	3%
Panama	70%	19%	7%	4%
Chile	64%	17%	16%	3%
Costa Rica	62%	25%	9%	4%
Brazil	61%	26%	8%	5%
Dominican Republic	57%	23%	18%	2%
Puerto Rico (Note: Note: Puerto Rico is a territory of the United States.)	56%	33%	8%	2%
El Salvador	50%	36%	12%	3%
Guatemala	50%	41%	6%	3%
Nicaragua	50%	40%	7%	4%
Honduras	46%	41%	10%	2%
Uruguay	42%	15%	37%	6%
Total	69%	19%	8%	3%

=== Family structure ===
The adolescent birth rate in women aged 10–19 years, 2016

Latin America has the highest rates of non-marital childbearing in the world, with 55–74% of all children in the region born to unmarried parents. In most countries in this traditionally Catholic region, children born outside marriage are now the norm. In 2014, non-marital births were 74% in Colombia, 70% in Paraguay, 69% in Peru, 63% in the Dominican Republic, 58% in Argentina, and 55% in Mexico. In Brazil, non-marital births increased to 65.8% in 2009, up from 56.2% in 2000. In Chile, non-marital births increased to 70.7% in 2013, up from 48.3% in 2000.

Latin America also has relatively high teenage pregnancy rates, much higher than North America, Europe, and much of Asia, but lower than sub-Saharan Africa.

=== Migration ===
The entire hemisphere was settled by migrants from Asia, Europe, and Africa. Indigenous Amerindian populations settled throughout the hemisphere before the arrival of Europeans in the late fifteenth and sixteenth centuries and the forced migration of slaves from Africa.

In the post-independence period, a number of Latin American countries sought to attract European immigrants as a source of labor as well as to deliberately change the proportions of racial and ethnic groups within their borders. Chile, Argentina, and Brazil actively recruited labor from Catholic southern Europe, where populations were poor and sought better economic opportunities. Many nineteenth-century immigrants went to the United States and Canada, but a significant number arrived in Latin America. Although Mexico tried to attract immigrants, it largely failed. As black slavery was abolished in Brazil in 1888, coffee growers recruited Japanese migrants to work in coffee plantations. There is a significant population of Japanese descent in Brazil. Cuba and Peru recruited Chinese labor in the late nineteenth century. Some Chinese immigrants who were excluded from immigrating to the United States settled in northern Mexico. When the United States acquired its southwest by conquest in the Mexican–American War, Latin American populations did not cross the border to the United States, the border crossed them.

In the twentieth century there have been several types of migration. One is the movement of rural populations within a given country to cities in search of work, causing many Latin American cities to grow significantly. Another is international movement of populations, often fleeing repression or war. Other international migration is for economic reasons, often unregulated or undocumented. Mexicans immigrated to the U.S. during the violence of the Mexican Revolution (1910–1920) and the religious Cristero War (1926–29); during World War II, Mexican men worked in the U.S. in the bracero program. Economic migration from Mexico followed the crash of the Mexican economy in the 1980s. Spanish refugees fled to Mexico following the fascist victory in the Spanish Civil War (1936–38), with some 50,000 exiles finding refuge at the invitation of President Lázaro Cárdenas. Following World War II a larger wave of refugees to Latin America, many of them Jews, settled in Argentina, Brazil, Chile, Cuba, and Venezuela. Some were only transiting through the region, but others stayed and created communities. A number of Nazis escaped to Latin America, living under assumed names, in an attempt to avoid attention and prosecution.

In the aftermath of the Cuban Revolution, middle class and elite Cubans moved to the U.S., particularly to Florida. Some fled Chile for the U.S. and Europe after the 1973 military coup. Colombians migrated to Spain and the United Kingdom during the region's political turmoil, compounded by the rise of narcotrafficking and guerrilla warfare. During the Central American wars of the 1970s to the 1990s, many Salvadorans, Guatemalans, and Hondurans migrated to the U.S. to escape narcotrafficking, gangs, and poverty. As living conditions deteriorated in Venezuela under Hugo Chávez and Nicolás Maduro, many left for neighboring Colombia and Ecuador. In the 1990s, economic stress in Ecuador during the La Década Perdida triggered considerable migration to Spain and to the U.S.

Some Latin American countries seek to strengthen links between migrants and their states of origin, while promoting their integration in the receiving state. These emigrant policies focus on the rights, obligations, and opportunities for participation of emigrated citizens who already live outside the borders of the country of origin. Research on Latin America shows that the extension of policies towards migrants is linked to a focus on civil rights and state benefits that can positively influence integration in recipient countries. In addition, the tolerance of dual citizenship has spread more in Latin America than in any other region of the world.

=== Education ===
World map indicating literacy rate by country in 2015 (2015 CIA World Factbook). Grey = no data.

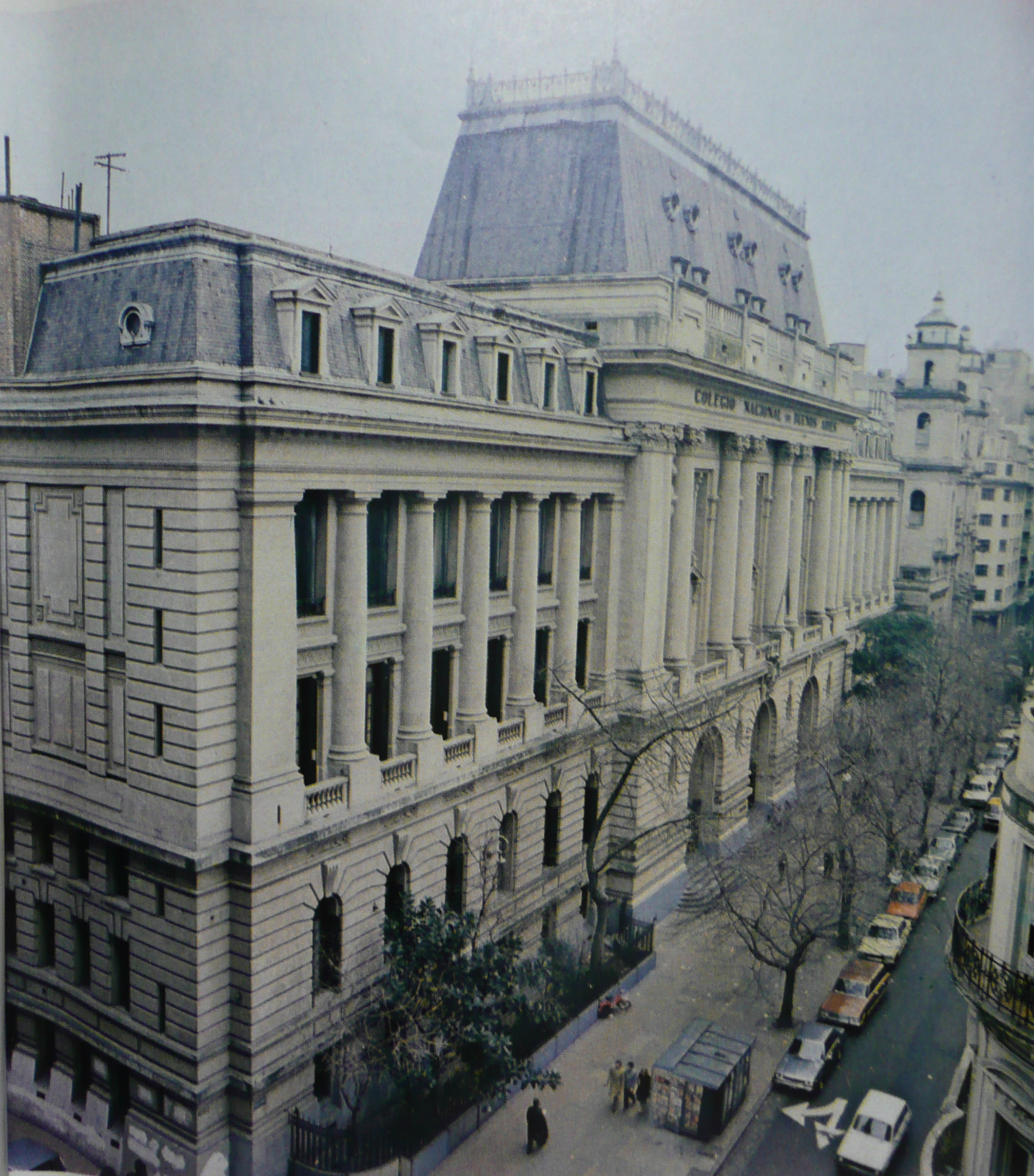
Colegio Nacional de Buenos Aires, one of the most prestigious schools in Latin America. Its alumni includes two Nobel laureates and four presidents of Argentina.

Despite significant progress, education access and school completion remains unequal in Latin America. The region has made great progress in educational coverage; almost all children attend primary school, and access to secondary education has increased considerably. Quality issues such as poor teaching methods, lack of appropriate equipment, and overcrowding exist throughout the region. These issues lead to adolescents dropping out of the educational system early. Most educational systems in the region have implemented various types of administrative and institutional reforms that have enabled reach for places and communities that had no access to education services in the early 1990s. School meal programs are also employed to expand access to education, and at least 23 countries in the Latin America and Caribbean region have large-scale school feeding activities, altogether reaching 88% of primary school-age children in the region. Compared to prior generations, Latin American youth have seen an increase in their levels of education. On average, they have completed two more years of school than their parents.

However, there are still 23 million children in the region between the ages of 4 and 17 outside of the formal education system. Estimates indicate that 30% of preschool age children (ages 4–5) do not attend school, and for the most vulnerable populations, the poor and rural, this proportion exceeds 40 percent. Among primary school age children (ages 6 to 12), attendance is almost universal; however, there is still a need to enroll five million more children in the primary education system. These children mostly live in remote areas, are Indigenous or Afro-descendants and live in extreme poverty.

Among people between the ages of 13 and 17 years, only 80% are full-time students, and only 66% of these advance to secondary school. These percentages are lower among vulnerable population groups: only 75% of the poorest youth between the ages of 13 and 17 years attend school. Tertiary education has the lowest coverage, with only 70% of people between the ages of 18 and 25 years outside of the education system. Currently, more than half of low income or rural children fail to complete nine years of education.

=== Life expectancy ===
List of countries by life expectancy at birth for 2023 according to the World Bank Group.

World Bank Group (2023)
Countries and territories	2023				Historical data											Recovery from COVID-19: 2019→2023
Countries and territories	All	Male	Female	Sex gap	2014	2014 →2019	2019	2019 →2020	2020	2020 →2021	2021	2021 →2022	2022	2022 →2023	2023	Recovery from COVID-19: 2019→2023
Puerto Rico	81.69	78.03	85.24	7.21	80.04	1.40	81.44	−1.43	80.01	−0.24	79.77	−0.34	79.43	2.26	81.69	0.25
Chile	81.17	79.24	83.08	3.84	79.71	0.61	80.32	−0.97	79.35	−0.47	78.88	0.30	79.18	1.99	81.17	0.84
Costa Rica	80.80	78.13	83.42	5.29	80.23	0.07	80.30	−0.57	79.72	−1.67	78.05	1.27	79.32	1.48	80.80	0.50
Panama	79.59	76.65	82.56	5.90	77.36	1.15	78.51	−2.18	76.33	0.67	77.00	2.32	79.32	0.27	79.59	1.08
Uruguay	78.14	74.19	81.92	7.73	77.19	0.31	77.50	0.88	78.38	−2.95	75.43	1.03	76.47	1.67	78.14	0.64
Cuba	78.08	75.67	80.52	4.85	77.83	−0.41	77.41	−0.01	77.41	−4.21	73.20	4.43	77.63	0.46	78.08	0.67
Peru	77.74	75.41	80.12	4.71	75.26	1.02	76.28	−2.44	73.83	−2.24	71.60	5.24	76.83	0.91	77.74	1.46
Colombia	77.72	74.95	80.45	5.50	75.95	0.84	76.79	−2.04	74.76	−2.06	72.70	3.81	76.51	1.22	77.72	0.93
Argentina	77.39	74.81	79.88	5.07	76.27	0.58	76.85	−0.97	75.88	−1.93	73.95	1.86	75.81	1.59	77.39	0.55
Ecuador	77.39	74.66	80.14	5.47	76.14	1.14	77.29	−5.28	72.00	0.74	72.75	3.83	76.58	0.81	77.39	0.11
Brazil	75.85	72.76	78.98	6.22	74.82	0.99	75.81	−1.30	74.51	−1.47	73.04	1.83	74.87	0.98	75.85	0.04
Mexico	75.07	72.24	77.81	5.57	74.40	0.13	74.53	−4.08	70.45	−0.70	69.75	4.22	73.97	1.10	75.07	0.54
Nicaragua	74.95	72.31	77.42	5.11	72.79	0.97	73.76	−3.00	70.77	−0.29	70.48	3.98	74.46	0.48	74.95	1.18
Paraguay	73.84	70.89	76.95	6.07	73.42	0.25	73.67	−0.95	72.72	−4.61	68.11	4.21	72.32	1.52	73.84	0.18
Dominican Republic	73.72	70.53	76.97	6.44	73.14	−0.03	73.11	−0.48	72.64	−0.88	71.76	2.45	74.21	−0.49	73.72	0.61
Honduras	72.88	70.35	75.50	5.16	71.03	1.09	72.12	−1.26	70.86	−1.37	69.49	3.22	72.72	0.17	72.88	0.76
Guatemala	72.60	70.31	74.88	4.56	70.94	0.70	71.64	−1.67	69.97	−2.11	67.86	3.35	71.21	1.40	72.60	0.96
Venezuela	72.51	68.72	76.50	7.78	72.84	−0.07	72.77	−0.40	72.37	−0.83	71.54	1.03	72.57	−0.05	72.51	−0.25
El Salvador	72.10	67.52	76.26	8.74	71.14	0.58	71.72	−1.48	70.24	−0.30	69.94	2.03	71.97	0.13	72.10	0.37
Bolivia	68.58	66.13	71.14	5.02	66.97	0.85	67.82	−4.91	62.91	−1.48	61.43	6.01	67.43	1.15	68.58	0.76
World	73.33	70.95	75.84	4.89	71.78	1.09	72.87	−0.68	72.18	−0.97	71.22	1.75	72.97	0.36	73.33	0.46

=== Public health ===
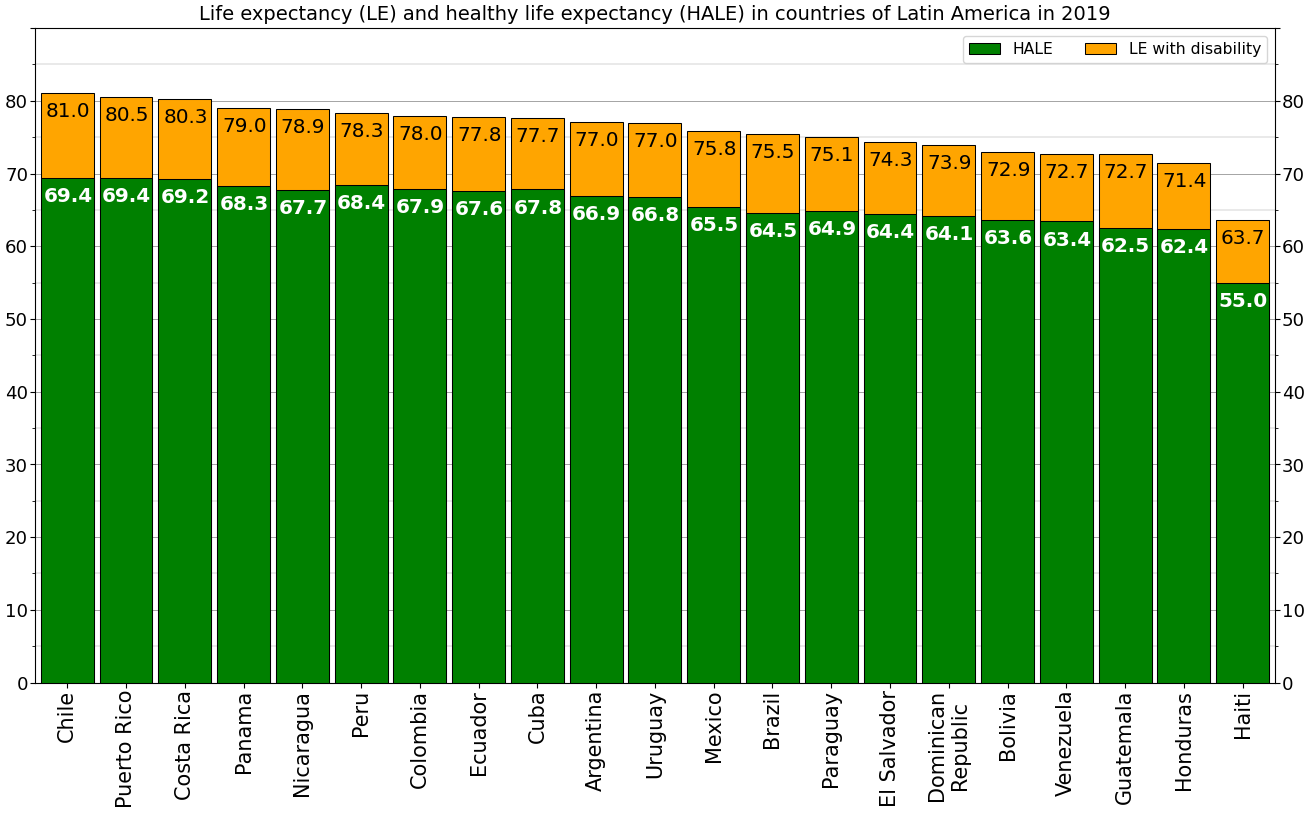
Life expectancy and healthy life expectancy in Latin America in 2019

==== Health Development in Latin America ====
Latin America has made notable progress in developing healthcare throughout the recent decades, and this is mostly driven even by both domestic policy and international collaborations. Some developments that were used:

- The Pan American Health Organization. (This section is an excerpt from Pan American Health Organization). The Pan American Health Organization (PAHO) is a specialized agency of the United Nations (UN) in charge of international health cooperation in the Americas. This organization has played a crucial role in making efforts to combat communicable and noncommunicable diseases, strengthen health systems, and respond to emergencies and disasters.
- Public/Private Initiatives and Partnerships. An example that has been in place since 2015 is the Salud Mesoamérica Initiative (SMI). This research project that focuses on the inequalities in health outcomes and access in Central America. It is a model that supports the transformation of health systems in each country, to bring coverage, access to healthcare, and health services among the poor in Mesoamérica, in particular women and children.

==== Water ====
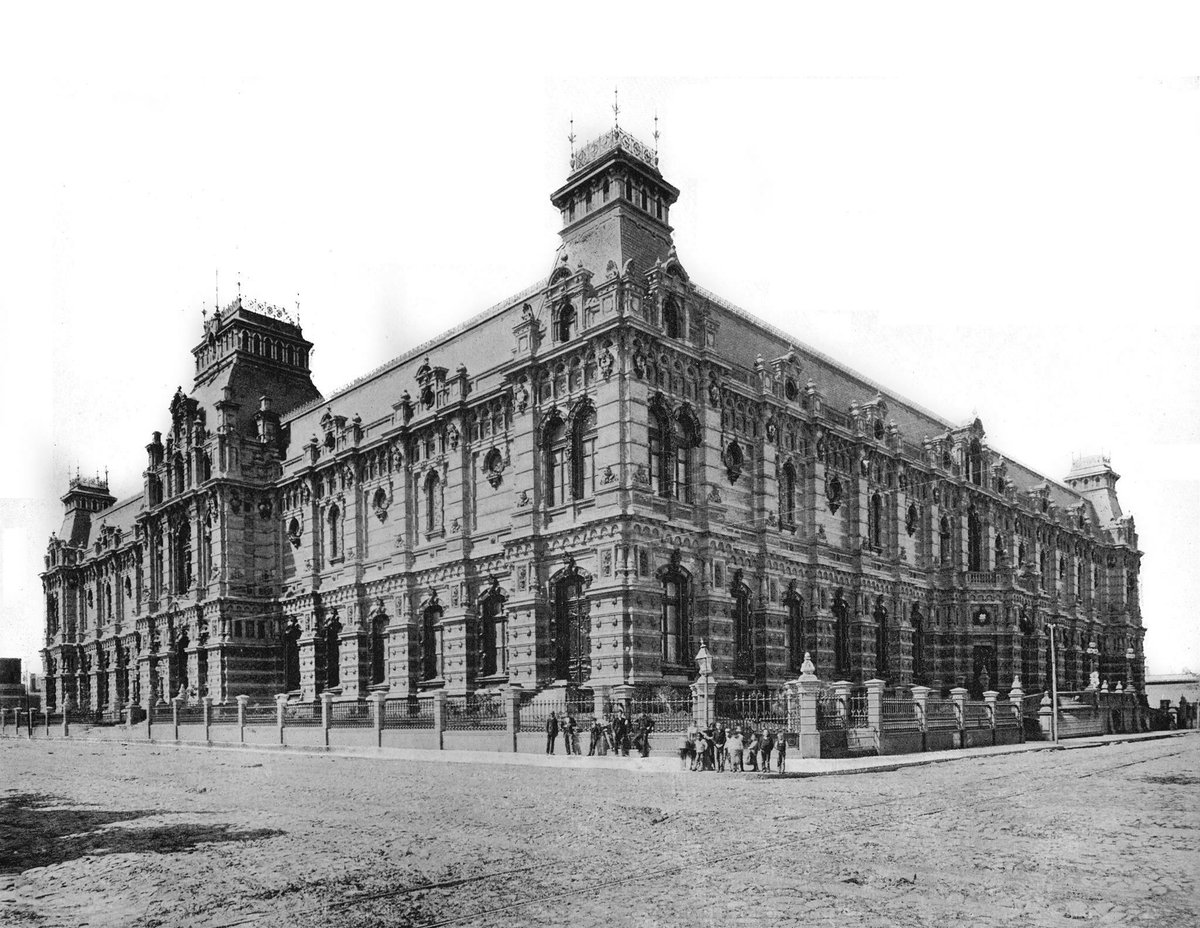
Palace of Running Waters, water pumping station and headquarters of Obras Sanitarias de la Nación soon after being inaugurated in Buenos Aires, Argentina.

Water supply and sanitation in Latin America is characterized by insufficient access and in many cases by poor service quality, with detrimental impacts on public health. Water and sanitation services are provided by a vast array of mostly local service providers under an often fragmented policy and regulatory framework. Financing of water and sanitation remains a serious challenge.

==== Reproductive rights ====
Latin America is home to some of the few countries of the world with a complete ban on abortion and minimal policies on reproductive rights, but it also contains some of the most progressive reproductive rights movements in the world. Debates on reproductive rights in the region occur over abortion, sexual autonomy, reproductive healthcare, and access to contraceptive measures. Modern reproductive rights movements most notably include the Green Wave (Marea Verde), which has led to much reproductive legislation reform. Cuba has been a regional leader for more liberal reproductive laws, while other countries like El Salvador and Honduras have increased restrictions on reproductive rights.

==== HIV/AIDS ====
HIV/AIDS has been a public health concern for Latin America due to a remaining prevalence of the disease. As of 2024, approximately 2.5 million people in Latin America were living with HIV. This is an increase from the 2018 estimation that 2.2 million people had HIV in Latin America and the Caribbean, making the HIV prevalence rate approximately 0.4% in Latin America. In 2024, there were approximately 120,000 new HIV infections in Latin America, nearly all of which were among adults aged 15 and older. That same year, the region experienced 27,000 AIDS-related deaths. Overall, approximately 71% of all people living with HIV in Latin America are on an antiretroviral treatment (ART), though this regional treatment coverage percentage is lower for children (age 0-14) and pregnant women.

Some demographic groups in Latin America have higher prevalence rates for HIV/ AIDS including men who have sex with men having a prevalence rate of 10.6%, and transgender women having one of the highest rates within the population with a prevalence rate of 17.7%. Female sex workers and drug users also have higher prevalence for the disease than the general population (4.9% and 1%-49.7% respectively).

=== Crime and violence ===
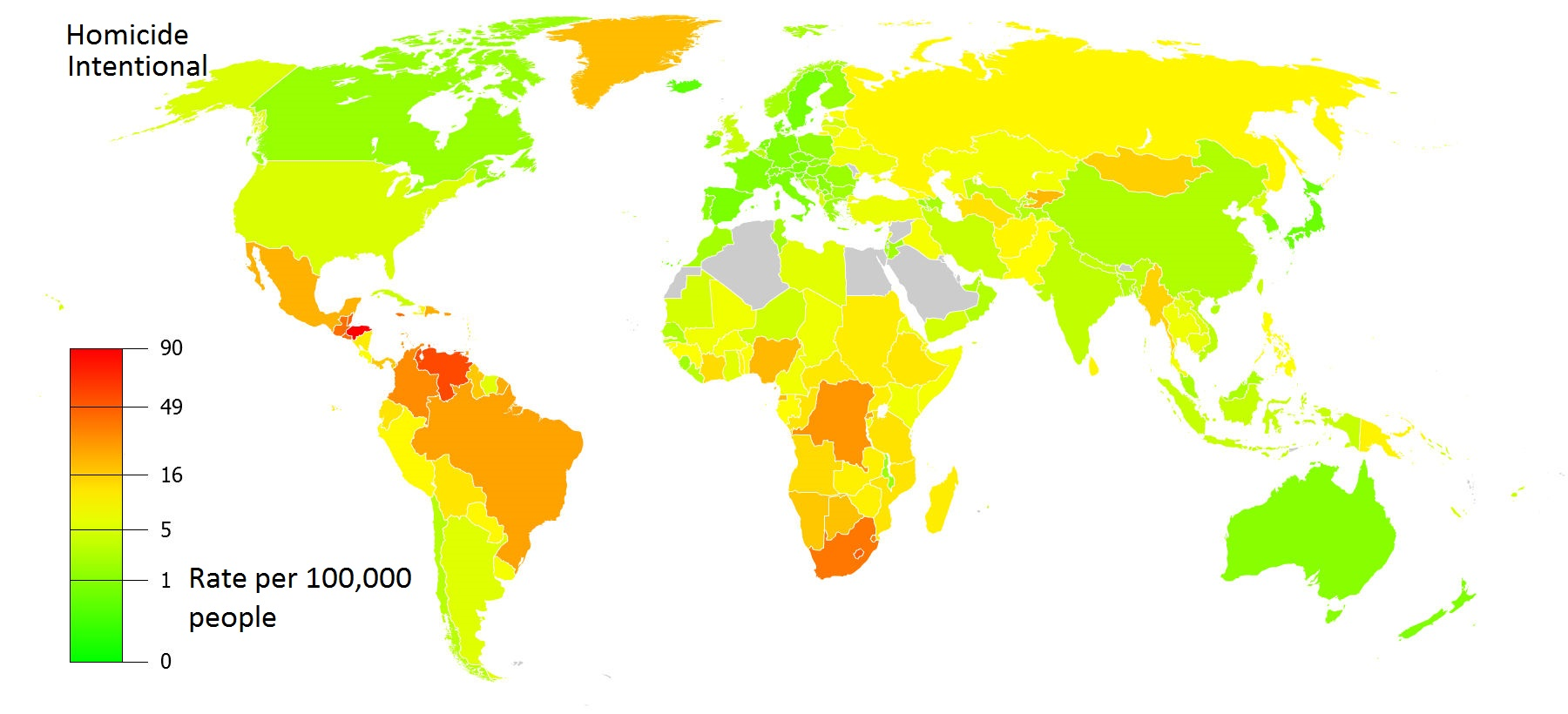
2012 map of countries by homicide rate. As of 2015, the Latin American countries with the highest rates were El Salvador (108.64 per 100,000 people), Honduras (63.75) and Venezuela (57.15). The countries with the lowest rates were Chile (3.59), Cuba (4.72) and Argentina (6.53).

Latin America has been cited by numerous sources to be the most dangerous region in the world. Studies have shown that Latin America contains the majority of the world's most dangerous cities.

Crime and violence prevention and public security are now important issues for governments and citizens in the Latin America region. Homicide rates in Latin America are the highest in the world. From the early 1980s through the mid-1990s, homicide rates increased by 50 percent. Latin America experienced more than 2.5 million murders between 2000 and 2017. There were a total of 63,880 murders in Brazil in 2018.

The most frequent victims of such homicides are young men, 69 percent of them between the ages of 15 and 19. Countries in Latin America and the Caribbean with the highest homicide rate per year per 100,000 inhabitants in 2015 were: El Salvador 109, Honduras 64, Venezuela 57, Jamaica 43, Belize 34.4, St. Kitts and Nevis 34, Guatemala 34, Trinidad and Tobago 31, the Bahamas 30, Brazil 26.7, Colombia 26.5, the Dominican Republic 22, St. Lucia 22, Guyana 19, Mexico 16, Puerto Rico 16, Ecuador 13, Grenada 13, Costa Rica 12, Bolivia 12, Nicaragua 12, Panama 11, Antigua and Barbuda 11, and Haiti 10. Most of the countries with the highest homicide rates are in Africa and Latin America.

Brazil has more overall homicides than any country in the world, at 50,108, accounting for one in 10 globally. Crime-related violence is the biggest threat to public health in Latin America, striking more victims than HIV/AIDS or any other infectious disease. Countries with the lowest homicide rate per year per 100,000 inhabitants as of 2015 were: Chile 3, Peru 7, Argentina 7, Uruguay 8 and Paraguay 9.

== Culture ==
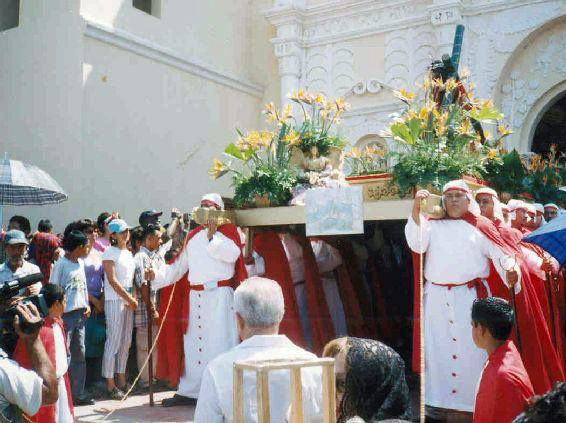
Roman Catholic Easter procession in Comayagua, Honduras

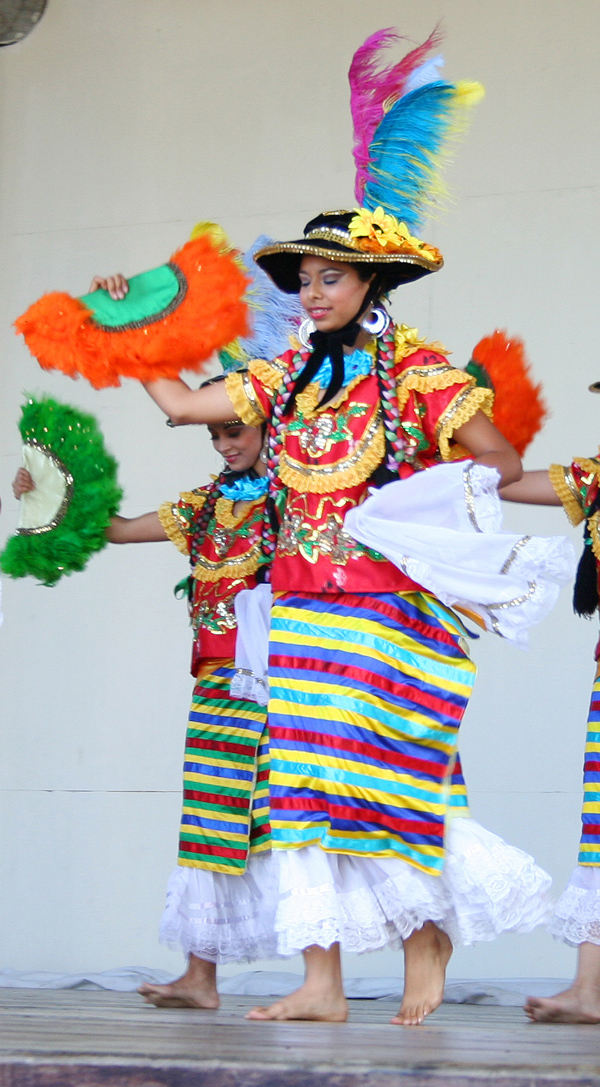
Nicaraguan women wearing the Mestizaje costume, which is a traditional costume worn to dance the Mestizaje dance. The costume demonstrates the Spanish influence upon Nicaraguan clothing.

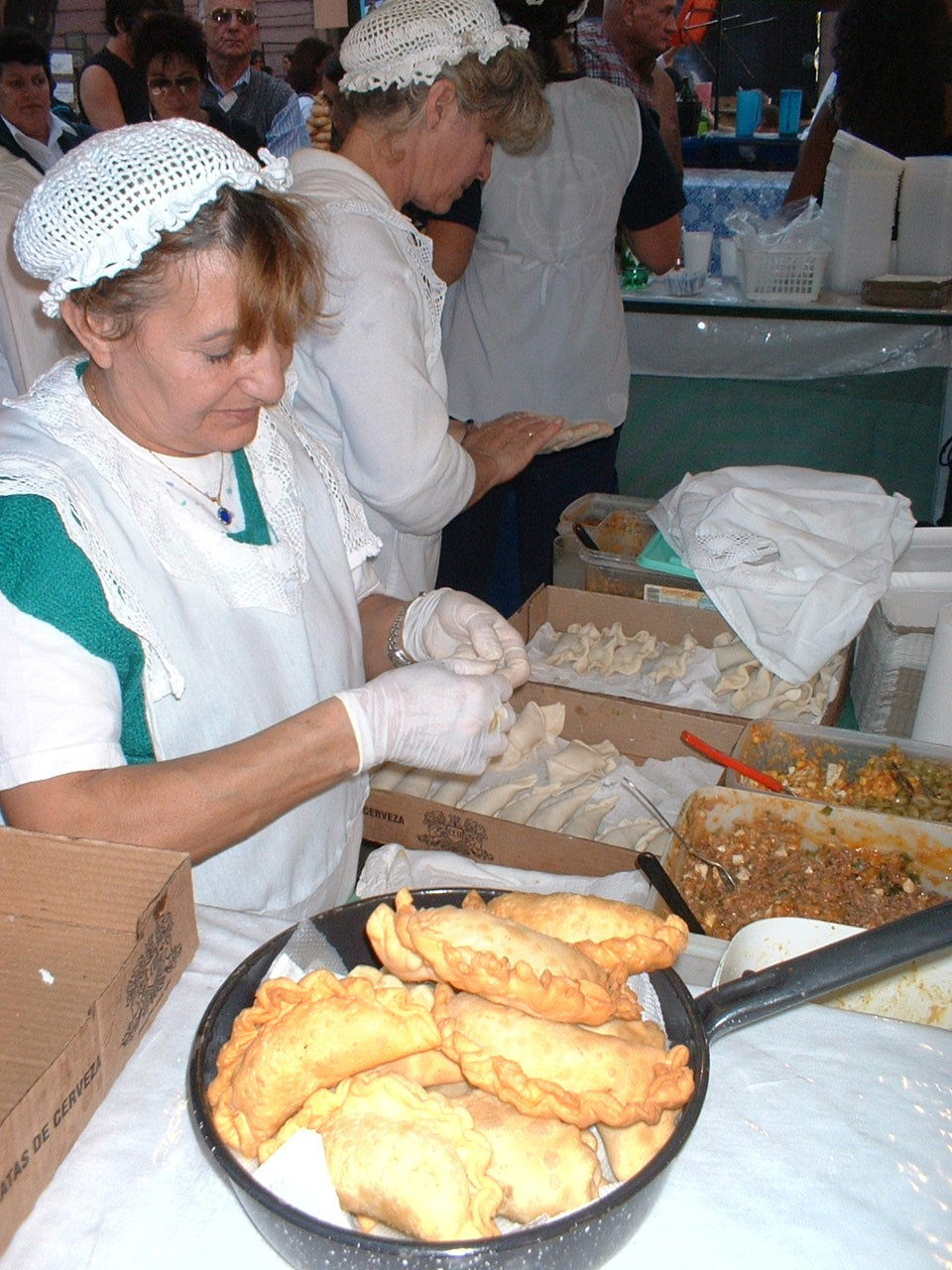
Argentine women making empanadas, a traditional Iberian food.

Latin American culture is a mixture of many influences including cultures from their indigenous people as well as European, African, Asian, and US influences.

Indigenous cultures are that of the people who inhabited the continent prior to European colonization. Ancient and advanced civilizations developed their own political, social and religious systems. The Maya, the Aztec and the Inca are examples of these. Indigenous legacies in music, dance, foods, arts and crafts, clothing, folk culture and traditions are strong in Latin America. Indigenous languages affected Spanish and Portuguese, giving rise to loanwords like pampa, taco, tamale, moccasin, cacique.

European cultures were brought mainly by the colonial powers – the Spanish and Portuguese – between the 16th and 19th centuries, including as part of the Spanish Golden Age. The most enduring European colonial influences are language, institutions, customs and Catholicism.

Additional cultural influences came from Europe during the 18th, 19th and 20th centuries, due to growing immigration from Spain, Portugal, France, Italy and Germany; as well as artistic, ideological and technological developments of the time. Due to the impact of Enlightenment ideals after the French Revolution, a certain number of Iberian American countries decriminalized homosexuality after France and French territories in the Americas did so in 1791.

Some of the countries that abolished sodomy laws or banned state interference in consensual adult sexuality in the 19th century were:

- Dominican Republic (1822)
- Brazil (1824)
- Peru (1836)
- Mexico (1871)
- Paraguay (1880)
- Argentina (1887)
- Honduras (1899)
- Guatemala
- El Salvador

Today same-sex marriage is legal in Argentina, Brazil, Chile, Colombia, Costa Rica, Ecuador, Mexico, Uruguay, and French overseas departments. South America experienced waves of immigration of Europeans, especially Italians, Spaniards, Portuguese, Germans, Austrians, Poles, Ukrainians, French, Dutch, Russians, Croatians, Lithuanians, and Ashkenazi Jews. With the end of colonialism, French culture also exerted a direct influence in Latin America, especially in the realms of high culture, Independentism, science and medicine. This can be seen in the region's artistic traditions, including painting, literature, and music, and in the realms of science and politics.

Latin America also sees influences from African cultures, whose presence stems from a long history of the Atlantic slave trade. People of African descent have influenced the ethno-scapes of Latin America and the Caribbean. This is manifested for instance in music, dance and religion, especially in countries like Brazil, Puerto Rico, Venezuela, Colombia, Panama, Honduras, Nicaragua, Costa Rica, Dominican Republic, and Cuba.

Asian cultures are also present, which derives from the long history of the coolies who mostly arrived during the 19th and 20th centuries. This was most commonly Chinese workers in Peru and Venezuela, but also from Japanese and Korean immigration- especially headed to Brazil. This has greatly affected cuisine and other traditions including literature, art and lifestyles and politics. Asian influences have especially affected Brazil, Cuba, Panama and Peru.

Lastly, the influence of the United States and globalization is present throughout the region, with particular strength in northern Latin America, especially Puerto Rico, which is an American territory. Prior to 1959, Cuba, which fought for its independence with American aid in the Spanish–American War, also had a close political and economic relationship with the United States. The United States also helped Panama become independent from Colombia and built the twenty-mile-long Panama Canal Zone in Panama, which it held from 1903—the Panama Canal opened to transoceanic freight traffic in 1914—to 1999, when the Torrijos–Carter Treaties restored Panamanian control of the Canal Zone.

=== Art ===
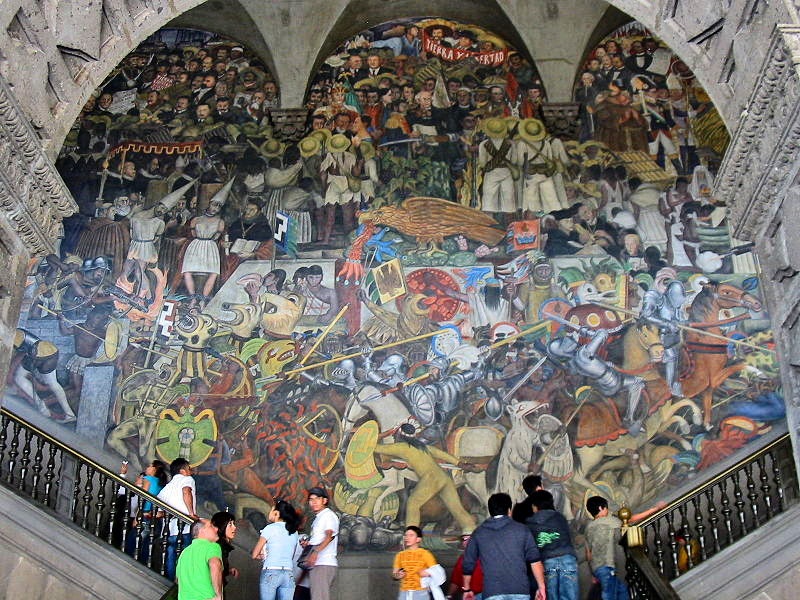
Diego Rivera's mural depicting Mexico's history at the National Palace in Mexico City

Beyond the tradition of Indigenous art, the development of Latin American visual art was influenced by Spanish, Portuguese and French Baroque painting, which in turn often followed the trends of the Italians. In general, artistic Eurocentrism began to wane in the early twentieth century with the increased appreciation for indigenous forms of representation.

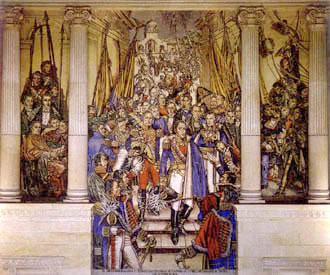
Mural by Santiago Martinez Delgado at the Colombian Congress

From the early twentieth century, the art of Latin America was greatly inspired by the Constructivist Movement. The movement rapidly spread from Russia to Europe and then into Latin America. Joaquín Torres García and Manuel Rendón have been credited with bringing the Constructivist Movement into Latin America from Europe.

An important artistic movement generated in Latin America is muralism represented by Diego Rivera, David Alfaro Siqueiros, José Clemente Orozco and Rufino Tamayo in Mexico, Santiago Martinez Delgado and Pedro Nel Gómez in Colombia and Antonio Berni in Argentina. Some of the most notable Muralista works can be found in Mexico, Colombia, New York City, San Francisco, Los Angeles, and Philadelphia.

Painter Frida Kahlo, one of the most famous Mexican artists, painted about her own life and the Mexican culture in a style combining Realism, Symbolism, and Surrealism. Kahlo's work commands the highest selling price of all Latin American paintings.

The Venezuelan Armando Reverón, whose works are recognized internationally, is one of the most important artists of the 20th century in South America; he is a precursor of Arte Povera and Happening. In the 60s kinetic art emerged in Venezuela. Its main representatives are Jesús Soto, Carlos Cruz-Diez, Alejandro Otero, and Gego.

Colombian sculptor and painter Fernando Botero has gained regional and international recognition for his works which, on first examination, are noted for their exaggerated proportions and the corpulence of the human and animal figures.

The Ecuadorian Oswaldo Guayasamín is considered one of the most important and seminal artists in Ecuador and South America. In his life, he made over 13,000 paintings and held more than 180 exhibitions all over the world, including Paris, Barcelona, New York, Buenos Aires, Moscow, Prague, and Rome. He brought his unique style of expressionism and cubism to the collection of Ecuador artwork during the Age of Anger which relates to the period of the Cold War when the United States opposed communist presence in South America. Social criticism of human and social inequality was central to his artwork.

=== Film ===
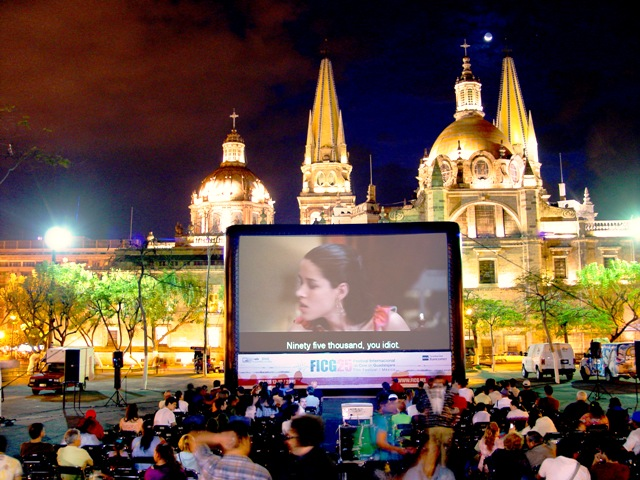
The Guadalajara International Film Festival is considered the most prestigious film festival in Latin America.

Latin American film encompasses a wide range of genres and national industries. Historically, the main centers of production have been Mexico, Argentina, Brazil, and Cuba. Latin American film flourished after sound was introduced in cinema, which added a linguistic barrier to the export of Hollywood film south of the border.

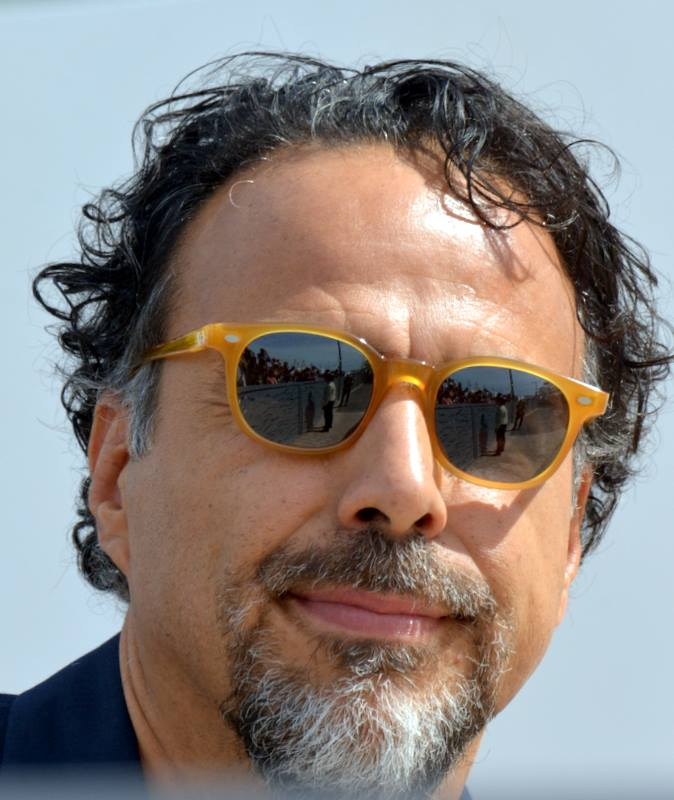
In 2015, Alejandro González Iñárritu became the second Mexican director in a row to win both the Academy Award for Best Director and the Directors Guild of America Award for Best Director. He won his second Oscar in 2016 for The Revenant.

Mexican cinema began in the silent era from 1896 to 1929 and flourished in the Golden Era of the 1940s. It boasted a huge industry comparable to Hollywood at the time, with stars such as María Félix, Dolores del Río, and Pedro Infante. In the 1970s, Mexico was the location for many cult horror and action movies. More recently, films such as Amores Perros (2000) and Y tu mamá también (2001) enjoyed box office and critical acclaim and propelled Alfonso Cuarón and Alejandro González Iñárritu to the front rank of Hollywood directors. Iñárritu in 2010 directed Biutiful and Birdman (2014), Alfonso Cuarón directed Harry Potter and the Prisoner of Azkaban in 2004 and Gravity in 2013. A close friend of both, Guillermo del Toro, a top rank Hollywood director in Hollywood and Spain, directed Pan's Labyrinth (2006) and produced El Orfanato (2007). Carlos Carrera (The Crime of Father Amaro), and screenwriter Guillermo Arriaga are also some of the best known modern Mexican film makers. Rudo y Cursi released in December (2008) in Mexico, was directed by Carlos Cuarón.

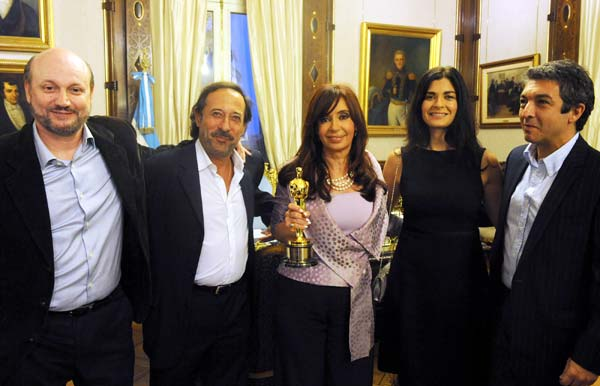
President Cristina Fernández with the film director Juan José Campanella and the cast of The Secret in Their Eyes (2009) with the Oscar for Best Foreign Language Film

Argentine cinema has also been prominent since the first half of the 20th century and today averages over 60 full-length titles yearly. The industry suffered during the 1976–1983 military dictatorship; but re-emerged to produce the Academy Award winner The Official Story in 1985. A wave of imported US films again damaged the industry in the early 1990s, though it soon recovered, thriving even during the Argentine economic crisis around 2001. Many Argentine movies produced during recent years have been internationally acclaimed, including Nueve reinas (2000), Son of the Bride (2001), El abrazo partido (2004), El otro (2007), the 2010 Foreign Language Academy Award winner El secreto de sus ojos, Wild Tales (2014) and Argentina, 1985 (2022).

In Brazil, the Cinema Novo movement created a particular way of making movies with critical and intellectual screenplays, clearer photography related to the light of the outdoors in a tropical landscape, and a political message. The modern Brazilian film industry has become more profitable inside the country, and some of its productions have received prizes and recognition in Europe and the United States, with movies such as Central do Brasil (1999), Cidade de Deus (2002) and Tropa de Elite (2007).

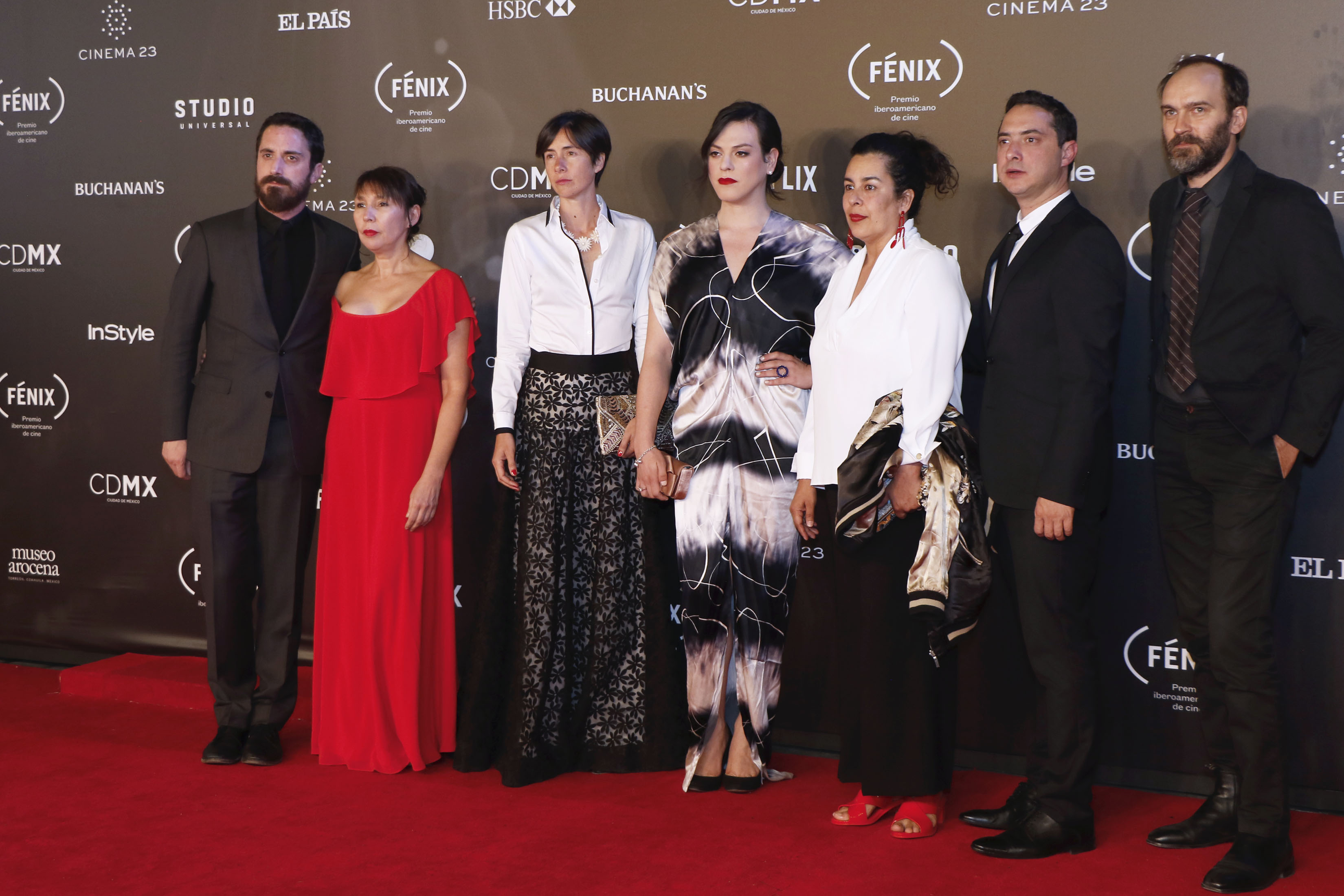
Cast of A Fantastic Woman on the red carpet at the Teatro de la Ciudad (City Theatre). It was selected as the Chilean entry for the Best Foreign Language Film where it won in the 90th Academy Awards.

Puerto Rican cinema has produced some notable films, such as Una Aventura Llamada Menudo, Los Diaz de Doris and Casi Casi. An influx of Hollywood films affected the local film industry in Puerto Rico during the 1980s and 1990s, but several Puerto Rican films have been produced since and it has been recovering.

Cuban cinema has enjoyed much official support since the Cuban revolution and important film-makers include Tomás Gutiérrez Alea.

Venezuelan television has also had a great impact in Latin America, is said that whilst "Venezuelan cinema began sporadically in the 1950s[, it] only emerged as a national-cultural movement in the mid-1970s" when it gained state support and auteurs could produce work. International co-productions with Latin America and Spain continued into this era and beyond, and Venezuelan films of this time were counted among the works of New Latin American Cinema. This period is known as Venezuela's Golden Age of cinema, having massive popularity even though it was a time of much social and political upheaval.

One of the most famous Venezuelan films, even to date, is the 1976 film Soy un delincuente by Clemente de la Cerda, which won the Special Jury Prize at the 1977 Locarno International Film Festival. Soy un delincuente was one of nine films for which the state gave substantial funding to produce, made in the year after the Venezuelan state began giving financial support to cinema in 1975. The support likely came from increased oil wealth in the early 1970s, and the subsequent 1973 credit incentive policy. At the time of its production the film was the most popular film in the country, and took a decade to be usurped from this position, even though it was only one in a string of films designed to tell social realist stories of struggle in the 1950s and '60s. Equally famous is the 1977 film El Pez que Fuma (Román Chalbaud). In 1981 FONCINE (the Venezuelan Film Fund) was founded, and this year it provided even more funding to produce seventeen feature films. A few years later in 1983 with Viernes Negro, oil prices dropped and Venezuela entered a depression which prevented such extravagant funding, but film production continued; more transnational productions occurred, many more with Spain due to Latin America's poor economic fortune in general, and there was some in new cinema, as well: Fina Torres' 1985 Oriana won the Caméra d'Or Prize at the 1985 Cannes Film Festival as the best first feature. Film production peaked in 1984–5,^{:37} with 1986 considered Venezuelan cinema's most successful year by the state, thanks to over 4 million admissions to national films, according to Venezuelanalysis. The Venezuelan capital of Caracas hosted the Ibero-American Forum on Cinematography Integration in 1989, from which the pan-continental IBERMEDIA was formed; a union which provides regional funding.

=== Literature ===
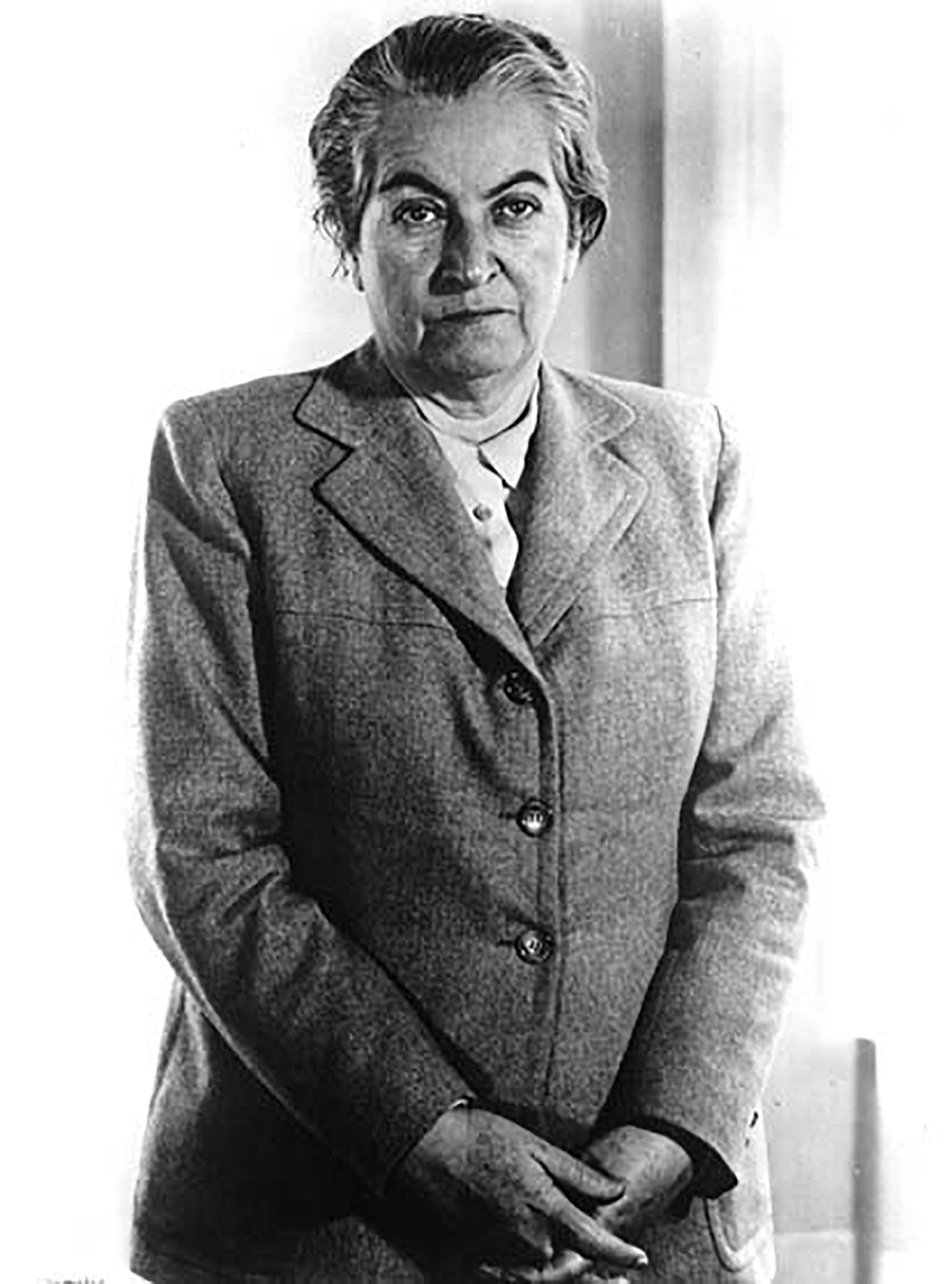
Chilean poet Gabriela Mistral, first Latin American to win a Nobel Prize in Literature, in 1945

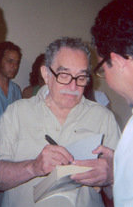
Gabriel García Márquez Nobel Prize in Literature in 1982, primarily for his masterpiece, "One Hundred Years of Solitude" ("Cien años de soledad").

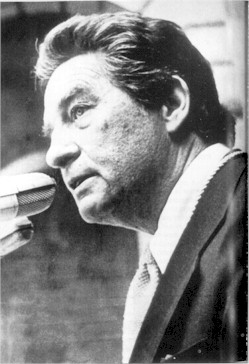
Octavio Paz Nobel Prize in Literature in 1990 for his influential body of work, which explored existential themes, Mexican identity, and the complexities of modernity

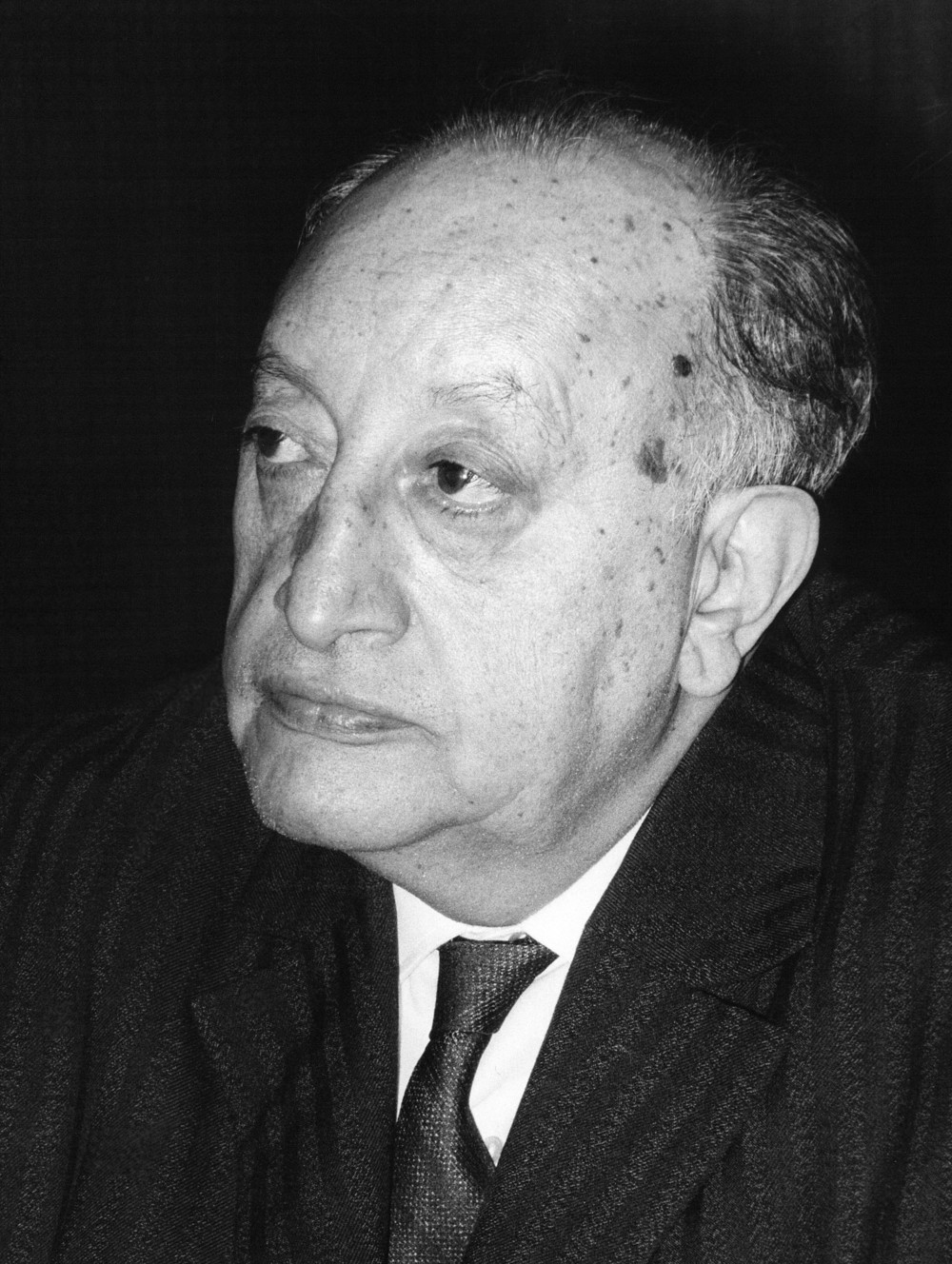
Miguel Ángel Asturias received the Nobel Prize in Literature in 1967 for his literary contributions, particularly for his novels that delve into the complexities of Latin American society and its indigenous cultures.

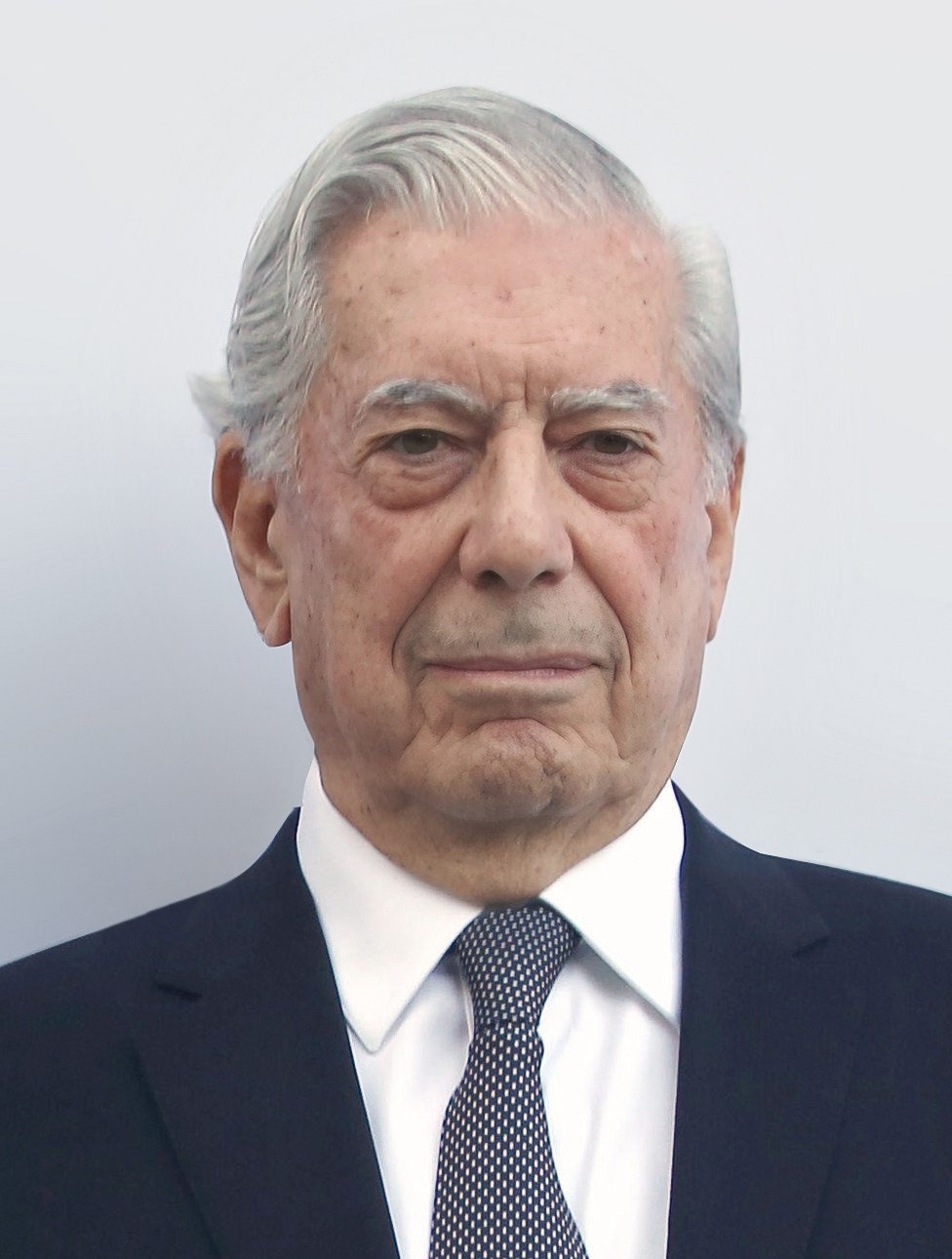
Peruvian Mario Vargas Llosa, the winner of the 2010 Nobel Prize in Literature and the 1994 Miguel de Cervantes Prize, among others

Pre-Columbian cultures were primarily oral, although the Aztecs and Maya, for instance, produced elaborate codices. Oral accounts of mythological and religious beliefs were also sometimes recorded after the arrival of European colonizers, as was the case with the Popol Vuh. Moreover, a tradition of oral narrative survives to this day, for instance among the Quechua-speaking population of Peru and the Quiché (K'iche') of Guatemala.

From the very moment of Europe's discovery of the continents, early explorers and conquistadores produced written accounts and crónicas of their experience – such as Columbus's letters or Bernal Díaz del Castillo's description of the conquest of Mexico. During the colonial period, written culture was often in the hands of the church, within which context Sor Juana Inés de la Cruz wrote memorable poetry and philosophical essays. Towards the end of the 18th century and the beginning of the 19th, a distinctive criollo literary tradition emerged, including the first novels such as Lizardi's El Periquillo Sarniento (1816).

The 19th century was a period of "foundational fictions" in critic Doris Sommer's words, novels in the Romantic or Naturalist traditions that attempted to establish a sense of national identity, and which often focussed on the Indigenous question or the dichotomy of "civilization or barbarism" (for which see, say, Domingo Sarmiento's Facundo (1845), Juan León Mera's Cumandá (1879), or Euclides da Cunha's Os Sertões (1902)). The 19th century also witnessed the realist work of Machado de Assis, who made use of surreal devices of metaphor and playful narrative construction, much admired by critic Harold Bloom.

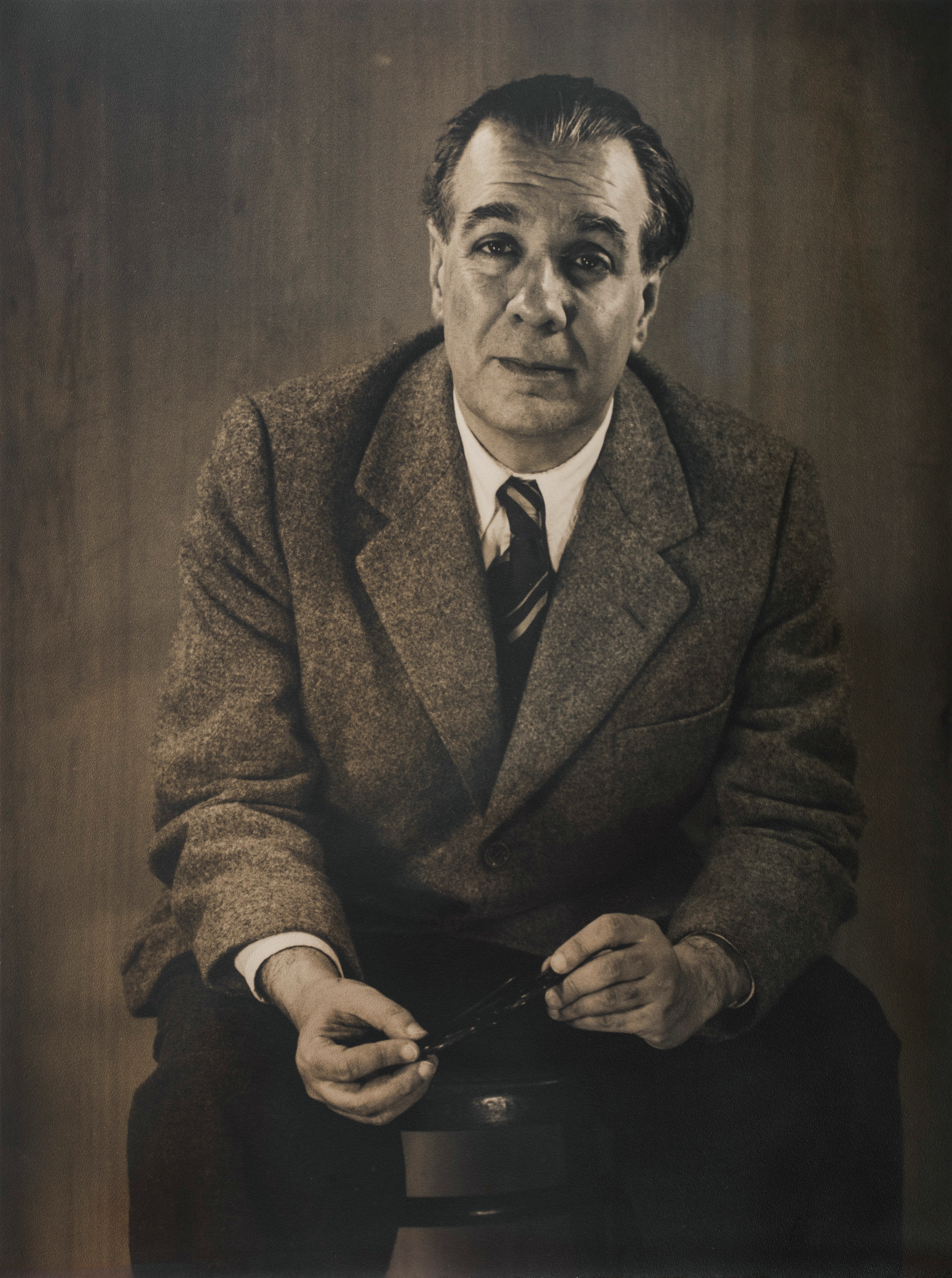
Jorge Luis Borges in 1951

At the turn of the 20th century, modernismo emerged, a poetic movement whose founding text was Nicaraguan poet Rubén Darío's Azul (1888). This was the first Latin American literary movement to influence literary culture outside of the region, and was also the first truly Latin American literature, in that national differences were no longer so much at issue. José Martí, for instance, though a Cuban patriot, also lived in Mexico and the United States and wrote for journals in Argentina and elsewhere.

However, what really put Latin American literature on the global map was no doubt the literary boom of the 1960s and 1970s, distinguished by daring and experimental novels (such as Julio Cortázar's Rayuela (1963)) that were frequently published in Spain and quickly translated into English. The Boom's defining novel was Gabriel García Márquez's Cien años de soledad (1967), which led to the association of Latin American literature with magic realism, though other important writers of the period such as the Peruvian Mario Vargas Llosa and Carlos Fuentes do not fit so easily within this framework. Arguably, the Boom's culmination was Augusto Roa Bastos's monumental Yo, el supremo (1974). In the wake of the Boom, influential precursors such as Juan Rulfo, Alejo Carpentier, and above all Jorge Luis Borges were also rediscovered.

Contemporary literature in the region is varied, ranging from Paulo Coelho and Isabel Allende to Diamela Eltit, Giannina Braschi, Ricardo Piglia, or Roberto Bolaño. There has also been considerable attention paid to the genre of testimonio, texts produced in collaboration with subaltern subjects such as Rigoberta Menchú. Finally, a new breed of chroniclers is represented by the more journalistic Carlos Monsiváis and Pedro Lemebel.

The region boasts six Nobel Prize winners: in addition to the two Chilean poets Gabriela Mistral (1945) and Pablo Neruda (1971), there is also the Guatemalan novelist Miguel Ángel Asturias (1967), the Colombian writer Gabriel García Márquez (1982), the Mexican poet and essayist Octavio Paz (1990), and the Peruvian novelist Mario Vargas Llosa (2010).

=== Music and dance ===
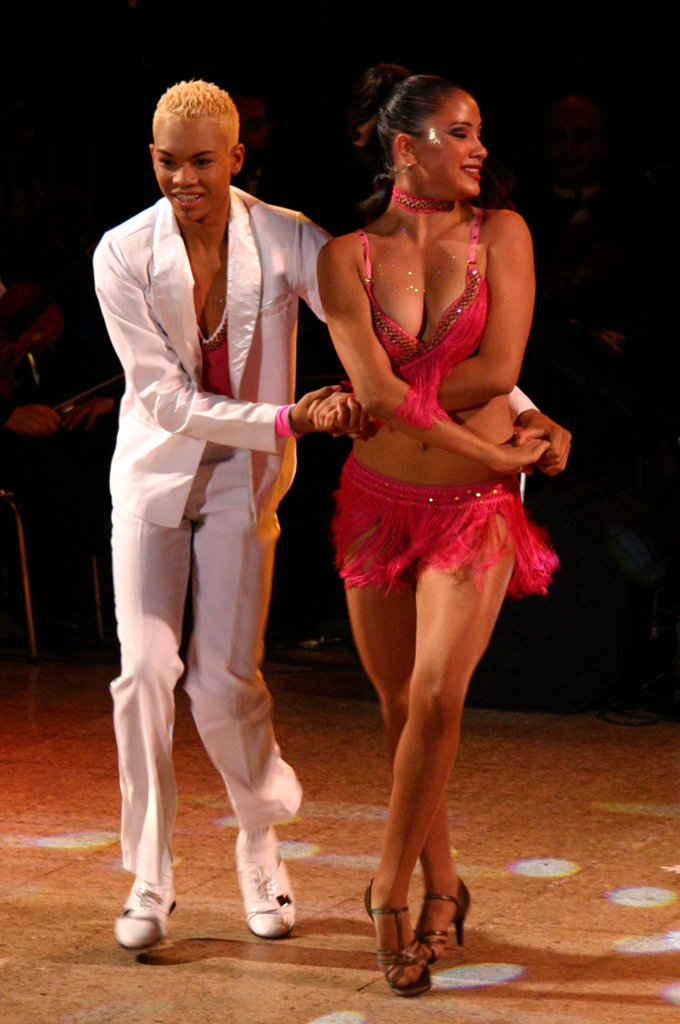
Salsa dancing in Cali, Colombia

Latin America has produced many successful worldwide artists in terms of recorded global music sales. Among the most successful have been Juan Gabriel (Mexico), the only Latin American musician to have sold over 200 million records worldwide, Gloria Estefan (Cuba), Carlos Santana, Luis Miguel (Mexico), who all have sold over 90 million records, and Shakira (Colombia) and Vicente Fernández (Mexico) with over 50 million records sold worldwide. Enrique Iglesias, although not a Latin American, has also contributed for the success of Latin music.

Other notable successful mainstream acts through the years include RBD, Celia Cruz, Soda Stereo, Thalía, Ricky Martin, Maná, Marc Anthony, Ricardo Arjona, Selena, and Menudo.

Latin Caribbean music, such as merengue, bachata, salsa, and more recently reggaeton, from countries such as the Dominican Republic, Puerto Rico, Cuba, and Panama, has been strongly influenced by African rhythms and melodies.

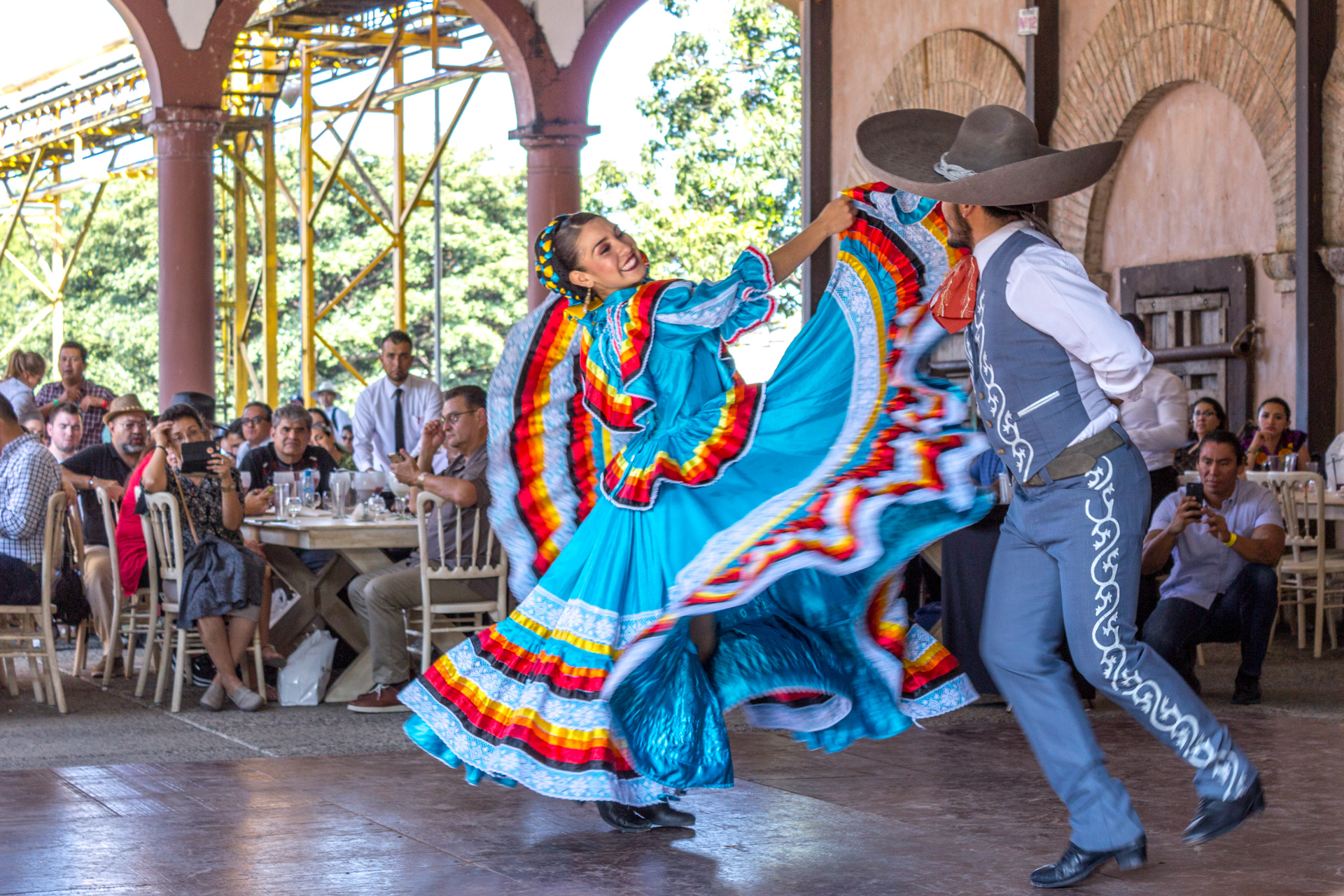
Traditional Mexican dance Jarabe Tapatío

Another well-known Latin American musical genre includes the Argentine and Uruguayan tango (with Carlos Gardel as the greatest exponent), as well as the distinct nuevo tango, a fusion of tango, acoustic and electronic music popularized by bandoneón virtuoso Ástor Piazzolla. Samba, North American jazz, European classical music and choro combined to form bossa nova in Brazil, popularized by guitarist João Gilberto with singer Astrud Gilberto and pianist Antonio Carlos Jobim.

Other influential Latin American sounds include the Colombian cumbia and vallenato, the Chilean cueca, the Ecuadorian boleros and rockoleras, the Honduran punta, the Mexican ranchera and the mariachi, which is the epitome of Mexican soul, the Nicaraguan palo de Mayo, the Peruvian marinera and tondero, the Uruguayan candombe and the various styles of music from pre-Columbian traditions that are widespread in the Andean region.

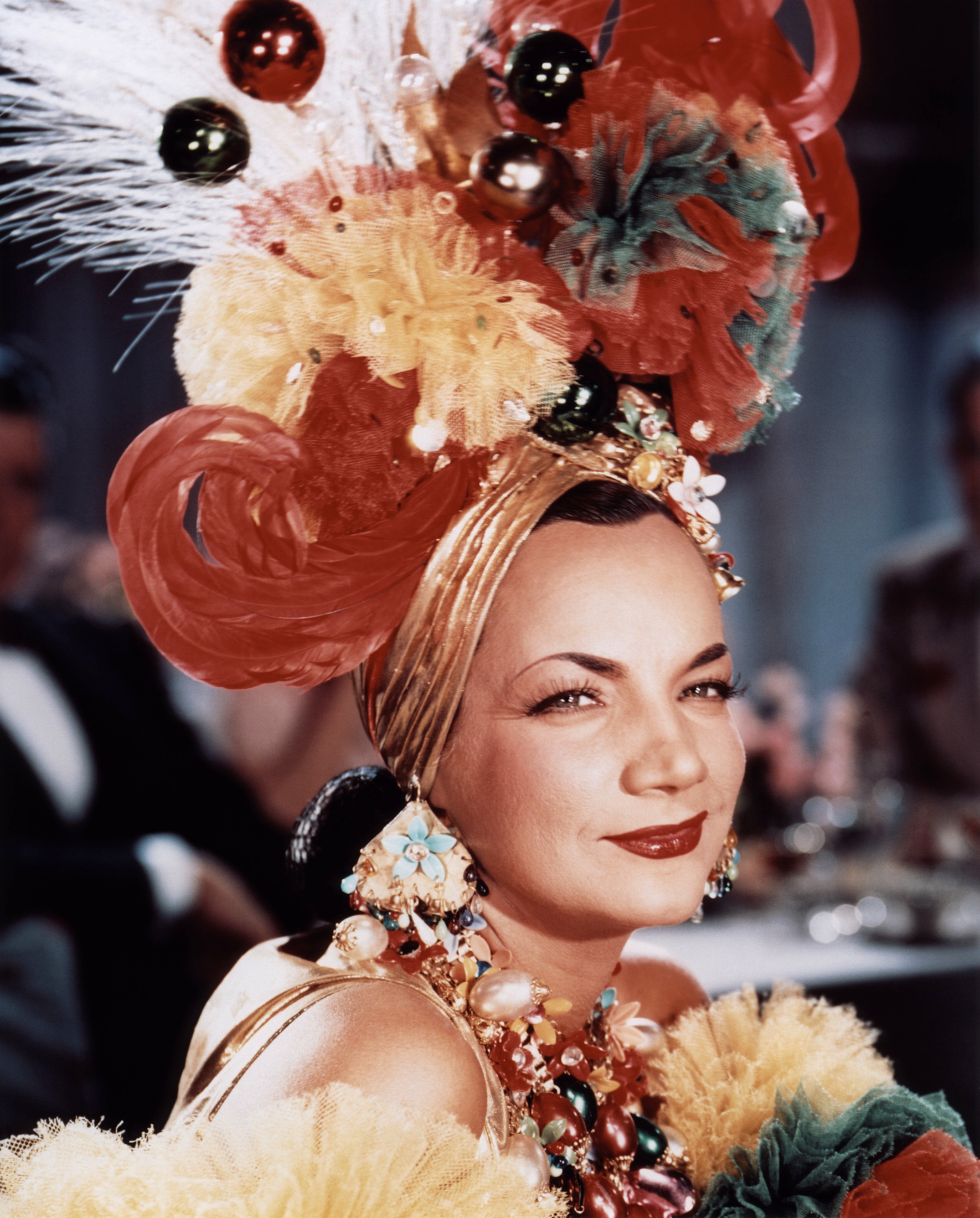
Brazilian singer Carmen Miranda helped popularize samba internationally.

The classical composer Heitor Villa-Lobos (1887–1959) worked on the recording of Native musical traditions within his homeland of Brazil. The traditions of his homeland heavily influenced his classical works. Also notable is the recent work of the Cuban Leo Brouwer, Uruguayan-American Miguel del Águila, guitar works of the Venezuelan Antonio Lauro and the Paraguayan Agustín Barrios. Latin America has also produced world-class classical performers such as the Chilean pianist Claudio Arrau, Brazilian pianist Nelson Freire and the Argentine pianist and conductor Daniel Barenboim. Brazilian opera soprano Bidu Sayão, one of Brazil's most famous musicians, was a leading artist of the Metropolitan Opera in New York City from 1937 to 1952.

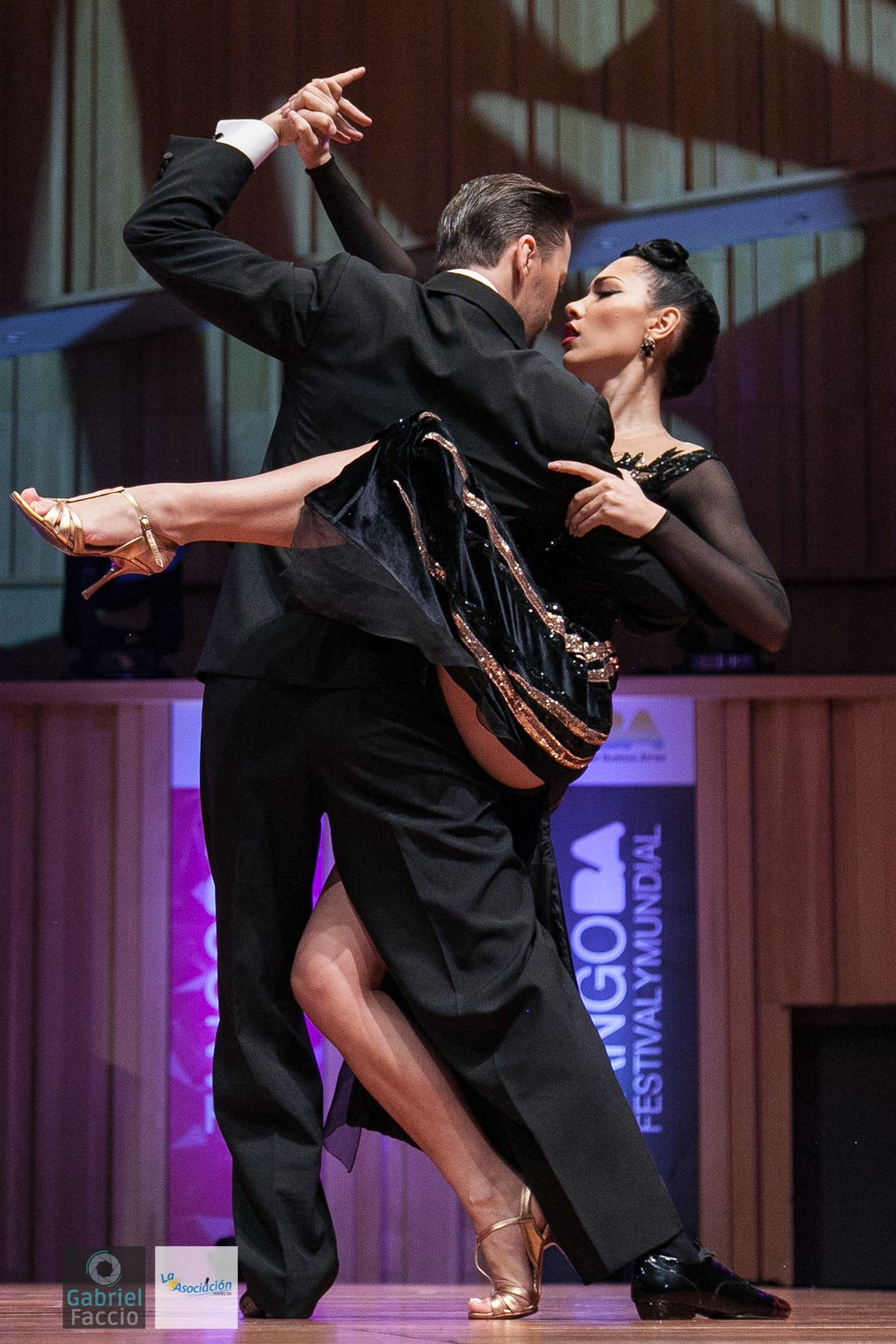
A couple dances tango in Buenos Aires, Argentina.

A main contribution to music occurred through folklore, where the culture of Latin American and Caribbean countries is expressed. Musicians such as Yma Súmac, Chabuca Granda, Atahualpa Yupanqui, Violeta Parra, Víctor Jara, Jorge Cafrune, Facundo Cabral, Mercedes Sosa, Jorge Negrete, Luiz Gonzaga, Caetano Veloso, Susana Baca, Chavela Vargas, Simon Diaz, Julio Jaramillo, Toto la Momposina, Gilberto Gil, Maria Bethânia, Nana Caymmi, Nara Leão, Gal Costa, Ney Matogrosso as well as musical ensembles such as Inti Illimani and Los Kjarkas are examples of the heights of such contribution.

Latin pop, including many forms of rock, is popular in Latin America today (see Spanish language rock and roll). A few examples are Café Tacuba, Soda Stereo, Maná, Los Fabulosos Cadillacs, Rita Lee, Mutantes, Secos e Molhados Legião Urbana, Titãs, Paralamas do Sucesso, Cazuza, Barão Vermelho, Skank, Miranda!, Cansei de Ser Sexy or CSS, and Bajo Fondo.

More recently, reggaeton, which blends Jamaican reggae and dancehall with Latin America genres such as bomba and plena, as well as hip-hop, is becoming more popular, in spite of the controversy surrounding its lyrics, dance steps (Perreo) and music videos. It has become very popular among populations with a "migrant culture" influence – both Latino populations in the United States, such as southern Florida and New York City, and parts of Latin America where migration to the United States is common, such as Trinidad and Tobago, Dominican Republic, Colombia, Ecuador, El Salvador, and Mexico.

=== World Heritage Sites ===
The following is a list of the twelve countries with the most UNESCO World Heritage Sites in Latin America.

Country	Natural sites	Cultural sites	Mixed sites	Total sites
Mexico	6	28	1	35
Brazil	7	14	0	21
Peru	2	9	2	13
Argentina	5	6	0	11
Cuba	2	7	0	9
Colombia	2	6	1	9
Bolivia	1	6	0	7
Chile	0	6	0	6
Panama	3	2	0	5
Ecuador	2	3	0	5
Guatemala	0	2	1	3
Uruguay	0	2	0	2

== See also ==
- Americas (terminology)
- Anglo-America
- Dutch America
- Euro-Latin American Parliamentary Assembly
- French America
- Hispanic America
- Hispanic and Latino Americans
- Ibero-America
- Inter-American Treaty of Reciprocal Assistance
- Latin America and the Caribbean
- Latin America and the League of Nations
- Latin America–United States relations
- Latin American integration
- Latin American studies
- Latin American Studies Association
- Latin Americans
- List of Latin Americans
- Mesoamerica
- Organization of American States
- Pan-American Conferences
- Pan-Americanism
