= Ports of Brazil =

Maritime transport is of vital importance to Brazil's commercial relations. Since the colonial era, maritime transport has played a fundamental role, facilitating extensive trade—a "triangular trade" system—between Portugal, Angola, and Brazil. Following the opening of its ports, maritime transport has enabled colonial Brazil to gain a degree of political autonomy from Portugal.

Maritime transport accounts for the majority of Brazil's international trade, carrying primarily agricultural and mineral commodities, vehicles, machinery, and high-tech equipment. Approximately 75% of Brazil’s international trade is transported by sea.

Passenger maritime transport also exists, primarily connecting the mainland to Brazil's coastal islands. The most well-known passenger route is between Natal and Fernando de Noronha. In the state of Bahia, ferry services operate between the Plataforma and Ribeira terminals (regulated by the municipal government) and between São Tomé de Paripe and Itamoabo on Ilha de Maré—part of the broader "Via Náutica de Salvador" (Salvador Nautical Route) project. Additionally, there are inter-municipal ferry services, such as the route between Salvador and Mar Grande, as well as the Salvador–Itaparica maritime crossing (TMSI). There is also intercontinental passenger transport—often illegal—occurring primarily between Brazil and Nigeria.

Brazil is home to the busiest seaports in Latin America, most notably the ports of Santos, Paranaguá, Rio de Janeiro/Niterói, Vitória, and Itaqui (in São Luís).

The ports of Brazil are overseen by the Brazilian Ministry of Transport.

City	Location	Port Operator/Authority	Port
Manaus	Amazon River	Companhia Docas do Estado de Amazonia	Port of Manaus
Santarém	Amazon River	Companhia Docas do Estado de Pará	Port of Santarém
Oriximiná	Rio Trombetas	Companhia Vale/Pará	Port of Trombetas
Santana	Amazon River	Companhia Docas do Estado de Amapá	Port of Santana
Belém	Rio Tocantins	Companhia Docas do Estado de Pará	Port of Belém
Barcarena	Rio Tocantins	Companhia Docas do Estado de Pará	Port of Vila do Conde
São Luís	South Atlantic	Companhia Docas do Estado de Maranhão	Ponta da Madeira
São Luís	South Atlantic	Empresa Maranhense de Administração Portuária – EMAP	Port of Itaqui
Fortaleza	South Atlantic	Companhia Docas do Estado de Ceará	Porto de Fortaleza (or Porto do Mucuripe)
São Gonçalo do Amarante	South Atlantic	Companhia Docas do Estado de Ceará	Port of Pecém
Natal	South Atlantic	Companhia Docas do Estado de Rio Grande do Norte	Port of Natal
João Pessoa	South Atlantic	Companhia Docas do Estado de Paraíba	Port of Cabedelo
Recife	South Atlantic	Porto do Recife S/A.	Recife Port
Ipojuca; Cabo de Santo Agostinho	South Atlantic	Suape – Complexo Industrial Portuário	Suape Port
Maceió	South Atlantic	Companhia Docas do Estado de Alagoas	Porto de Maceió or Porto de Jaraguá
Barra dos Coqueiros	South Atlantic	Companhia Docas do Estado de Sergipe	Port of Barra dos Coqueiros
Salvador	South Atlantic	Companhia Docas do Estado da Bahia	Port of Salvador
Candeias	Bahia de Todos os Santos	Companhia Docas do Estado da Bahia	Port of Aratu
Ilhéus	South Atlantic	Companhia Docas do Estado do Sul da Bahia	Port of Ilhéus
Vitória	South Atlantic	Companhia Docas do Estado do Espírito Santo	Port of Vitória
Tubarão	South Atlantic	Companhia Vale /Espírito Santo	Port of Tubarão
Rio de Janeiro	Guanabara	Companhia Docas do Estado do Rio de Janeiro	Port of Rio de Janeiro
Itaguaí	South Atlantic	Companhia Docas do Estado do Rio de Janeiro	Port of Itaguaí (Sepetiba)
Angra dos Reis	South Atlantic	Companhia Docas do Estado do Rio de Janeiro	Port of Angra dos Reis
São Sebastião	South Atlantic	Companhia Docas do Estado de São Paulo	Port of São Sebastião
Santos	South Atlantic	Companhia Docas do Estado de São Paulo	Port of Santos
Paranaguá	South Atlantic	Administração dos Portos de Paranaguá e Antonina – APPA	Port of Paranaguá
Itapoá	South Atlantic	Itapoá Terminais Portuários	Port of Itapoá
São Francisco do Sul	South Atlantic	Administração do Porto de São Francisco do Sul - APSFS	Port of São Francisco do Sul
Navegantes	South Atlantic	Portonave S/A	Port of Navegantes
Itajaí	South Atlantic	Superintendência do Porto de Itajaí/Administradora Hidroviária Docas Catarinense – ADHOC	Port of Itajaí
Imbituba	South Atlantic	Companhia Docas de Imbituba	Port of Imbituba
Porto Alegre	Lagoa dos Patos	Superintendência de Portos e Hidrovias do Rio Grande do Sul – SPH	Port of Porto Alegre
Pelotas	Lagoa dos Patos	Superintendência de Portos e Hidrovias do Rio Grande do Sul – SPH	Port of Pelotas
Rio Grande	South Atlantic	Superintendência do Porto de Rio Grande – SUPRG	Port of Rio Grande

The Port of Santos near São Paulo is the busiest container port in Latin America and the 37th busiest in the world. Situated on the left margin of the Port of Santos, Tecon Santos (Santos Brasil) is considered a benchmark in matters of efficiency in South America and holds the highest average MPH (movements per hour) in Latin America: 81.86. The terminal has 596,000 square meters and a capacity to handle 2 million TEUs per year.

== See also ==
- Santos Brasil
- Brazilian Ministry of Transport
