= Transport in Brazil =

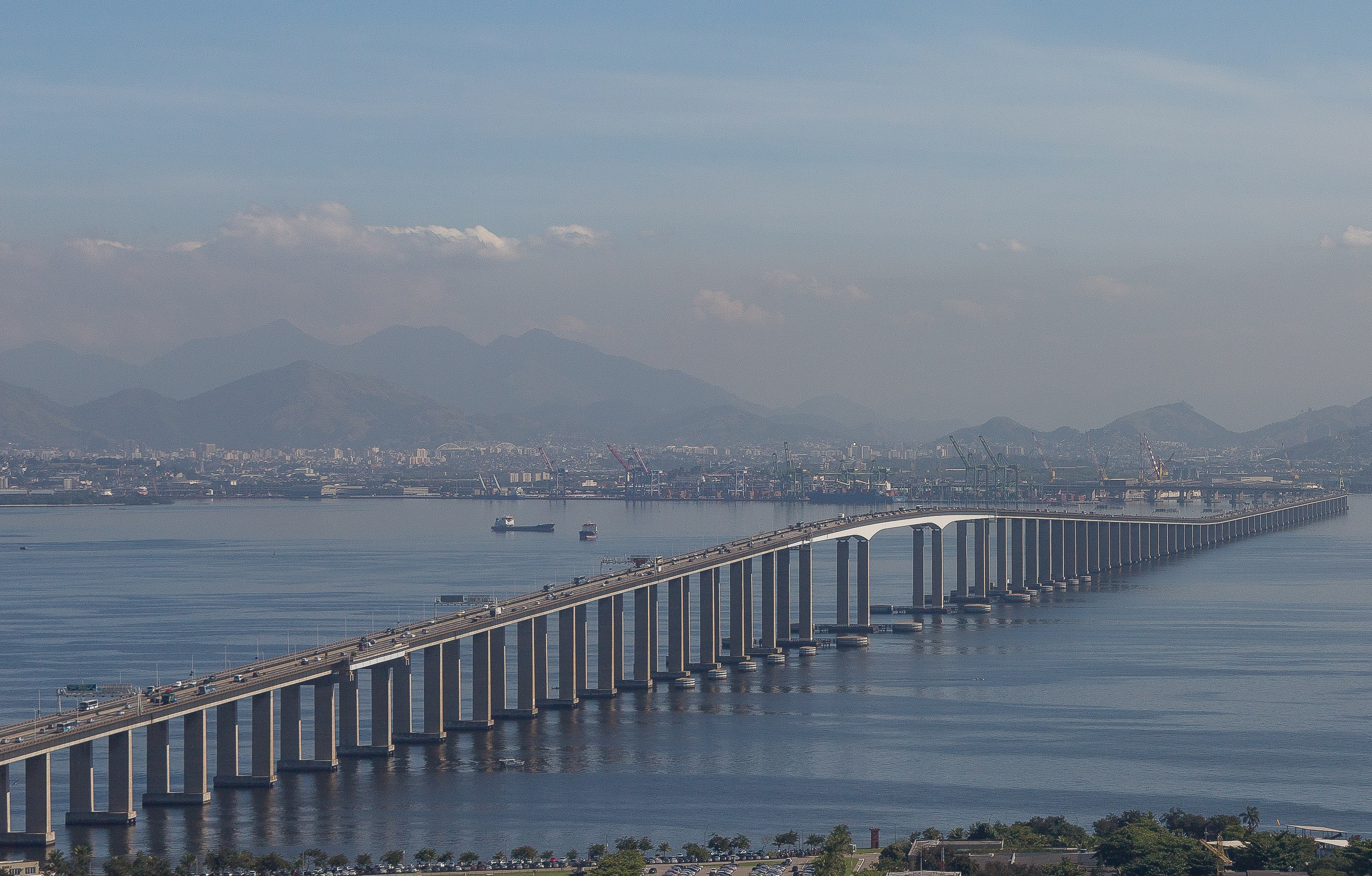
Rio–Niterói Bridge

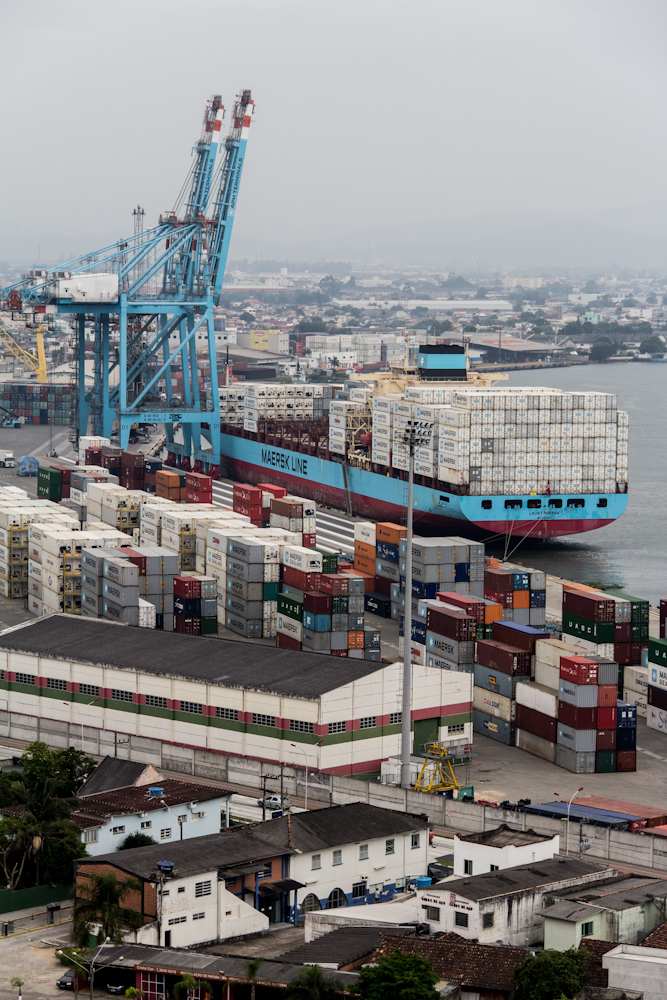
Port of Itajaí, Santa Catarina, Brazil

Transport infrastructure in Brazil is characterized by strong regional differences and lack of development of the national rail network. Brazil's fast-growing economy, and especially the growth in exports, will place increasing demands on the transport networks. However, sizeable new investments that are expected to address some of the issues are either planned or in progress. It is common to travel domestically by air because the price is low. Brazil has the second highest number of airports in the world, after the USA.

== Railways ==
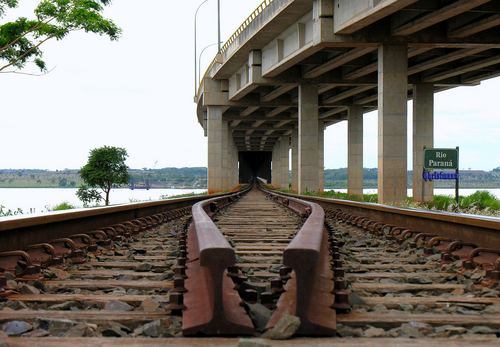
Norte Brasil Railway

Map of Brazilian rail network, 2016

The Brazilian railway network has an extension of about 30,000 km (18,641 mi). It is primarily used for transporting ores. Usually, the railway sector was treated in a secondary way in Brazil, due to logistical, economic or political difficulties to install more railways.

The Brazilian railroad system had a great expansion between 1875 and 1920. The heyday of the railway modal was interrupted during the Getúlio Vargas government, which prioritized the road modal. In the 1940s, the railway network was already facing several problems, from low-powered locomotives to uneconomical layouts. In 1957, a state-owned company was created, the National Railroad Network (RFFSA), which started to manage 18 railroads in the Union. Several deficit railways were closed under the promise of state investment in new projects, which did not happen. The actions were centralized in the government until the opening of the market in 1990. So, the National Privatization Plan was instituted, with dozens of concessions being made. However, they ended up concentrating the railways, mainly, in three large business groups, América Latina Logística (ALL), Vale S.A. and MRS Logística. The refurbishment generated an increase in productivity (cargoes transported increased by 30% with the same railway line). However, the main problem was that the reform not only gave away the railway line, but also geographical exclusivity. This resulted in the non-creation of competitive incentives for the expansion and renewal of the existing network. With the State maintaining the opening of new railways a difficult, slow and bureaucratic process, as it maintains the total monopoly of power over this sector, the railways did not expand any further in the country, and the sector was very outdated.

In 2021, a New Framework for Railways was created, allowing the construction of railways by authorization, as occurs in the exploration of infrastructure in sectors such as telecommunications, electricity and ports. It's also possible to authorize the exploration of stretches not implemented, idle, or in the process of being returned or deactivated. With the change of rules in the sector, in December 2021, there were already requests to open 15,000 km (9,321 mi) of new tracks, in 64 requests for implementation of new railways. Nine new railroads had already been authorized by the Federal Government, in 3,506 km (2,179 mi) of new tracks.

- Total actual network: 29,888 km of railroad and 1,411 km of subway and light rail

Broad gauge: 4,932 km 1,600 mm (5 ft 3 in) gauge (939 km electrified)
Narrow gauge: 23,341 km 1,000 mm (3 ft 3 3/8 in) gauge (24 km electrified)
Dual gauge: 396 km 1000 mm and 1600 mm gauges (three rails)
Standard gauge: 194 km 1,435 mm (4 ft 8 1/2 in) gauge (2014)

- Estrada de Ferro do Amapá in the middle of the Amazon rainforest also used standard gauge.
- A 12 km section of the former 2 ft 6 in (762 mm) gauge Estrada de Ferro Oeste de Minas is retained as a heritage railway.

=== Metros, commuter rail and light rail transit (combined) ===
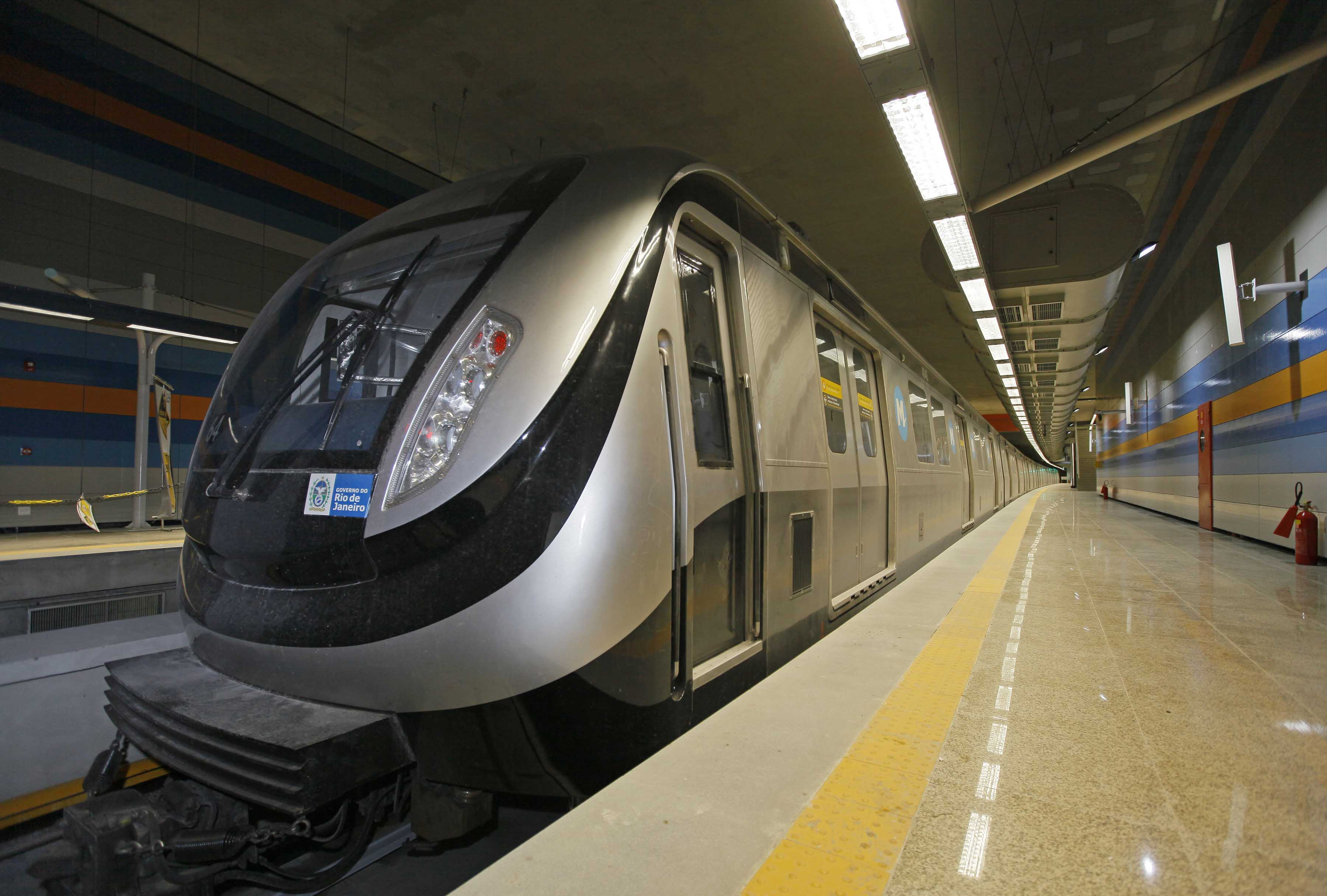
Rio de Janeiro Metro

- Teresina (13.5 km)*
- Juazeiro do Norte (13.6 km)*
- Sobral (13.9 km)*
- Belo Horizonte (28.1 km)
- João Pessoa (30 km)*
- Maceió (32.1 km)*
- Salvador (33 km)
- Federal District (42.4 km)
- Porto Alegre (43.4 km)*
- Fortaleza (43.6 km)*
- Natal (56.2 km)
- Recife (71 km)*
- Rio de Janeiro (355 km)*
- São Paulo (377 km)
- Santos (11.1 km)*

Note (*): Light Rail Transit, Light Metro, Tram or Subway-Surface fully or partially operated.

=== Railway links with adjacent countries ===
International rail links exist between Brazil and Argentina, Bolivia and Uruguay.

=== Tramways ===
Brazil had a hundred tramway systems. Currently, there are vintage tramways operating in Belém, Campinas, Campos do Jordão, Itatinga, Rio de Janeiro and Santos.

== Highways ==
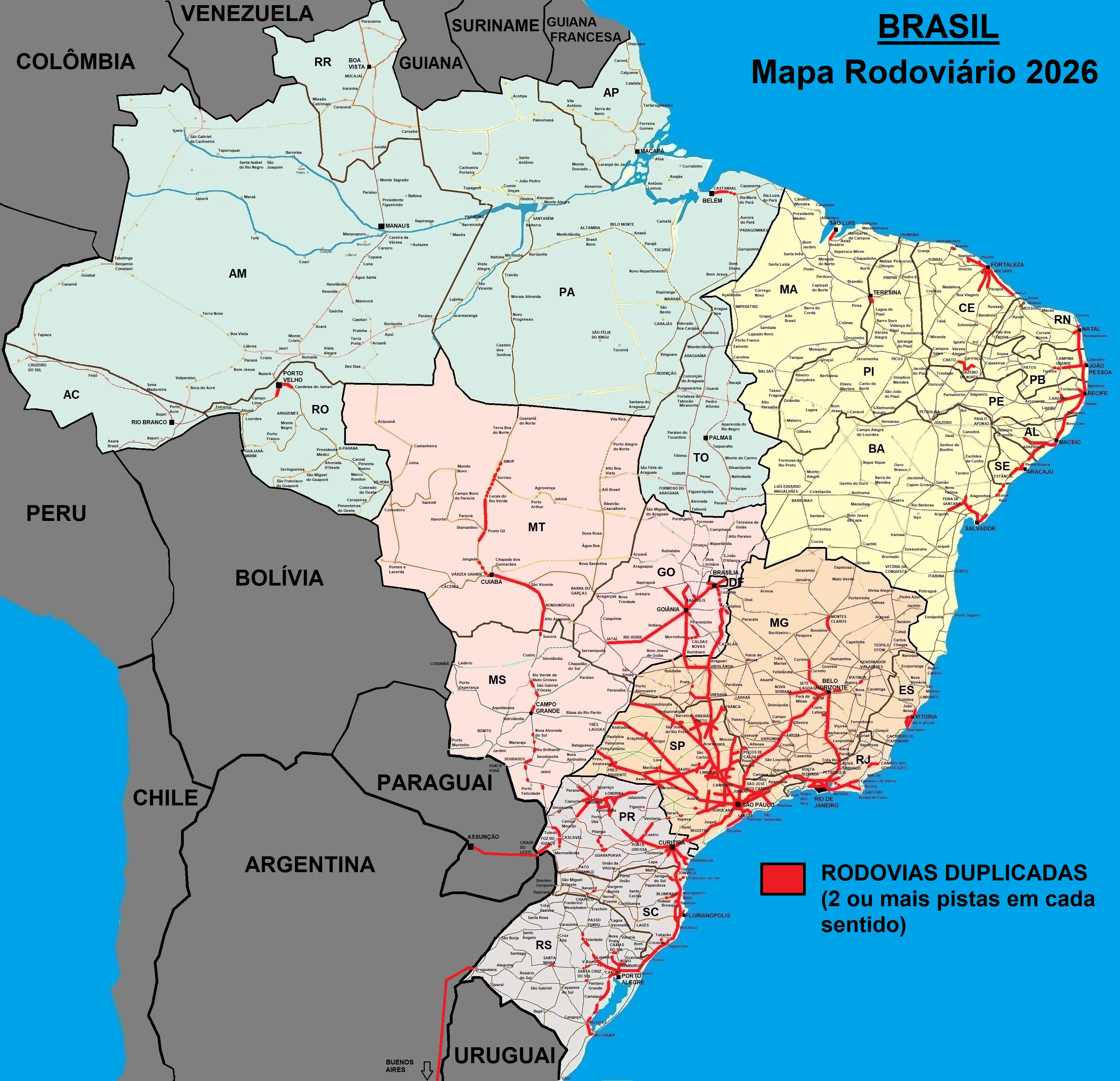
Road system in Brazil, with divided highways highlighted in red.

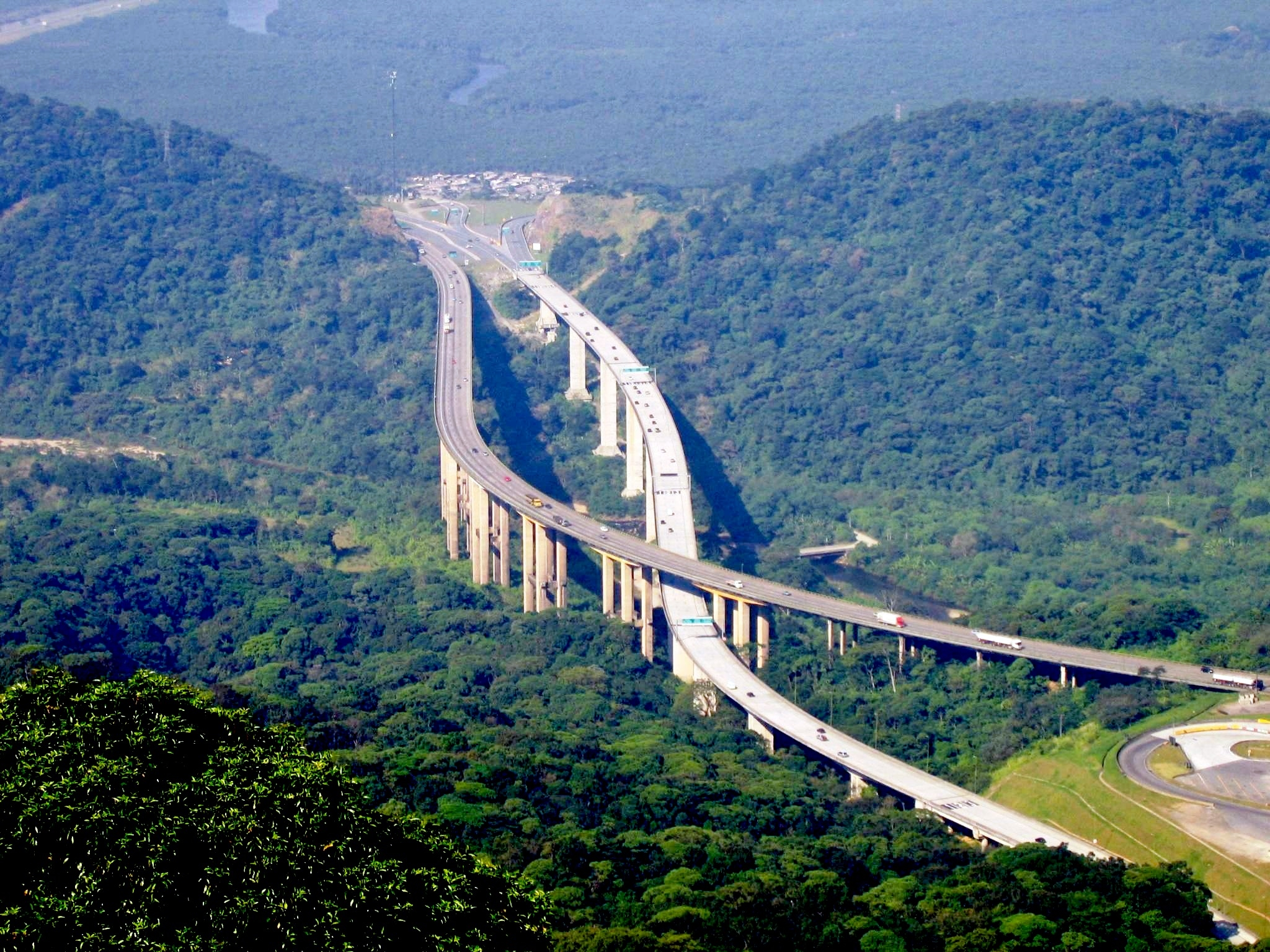
Rodovia dos Imigrantes

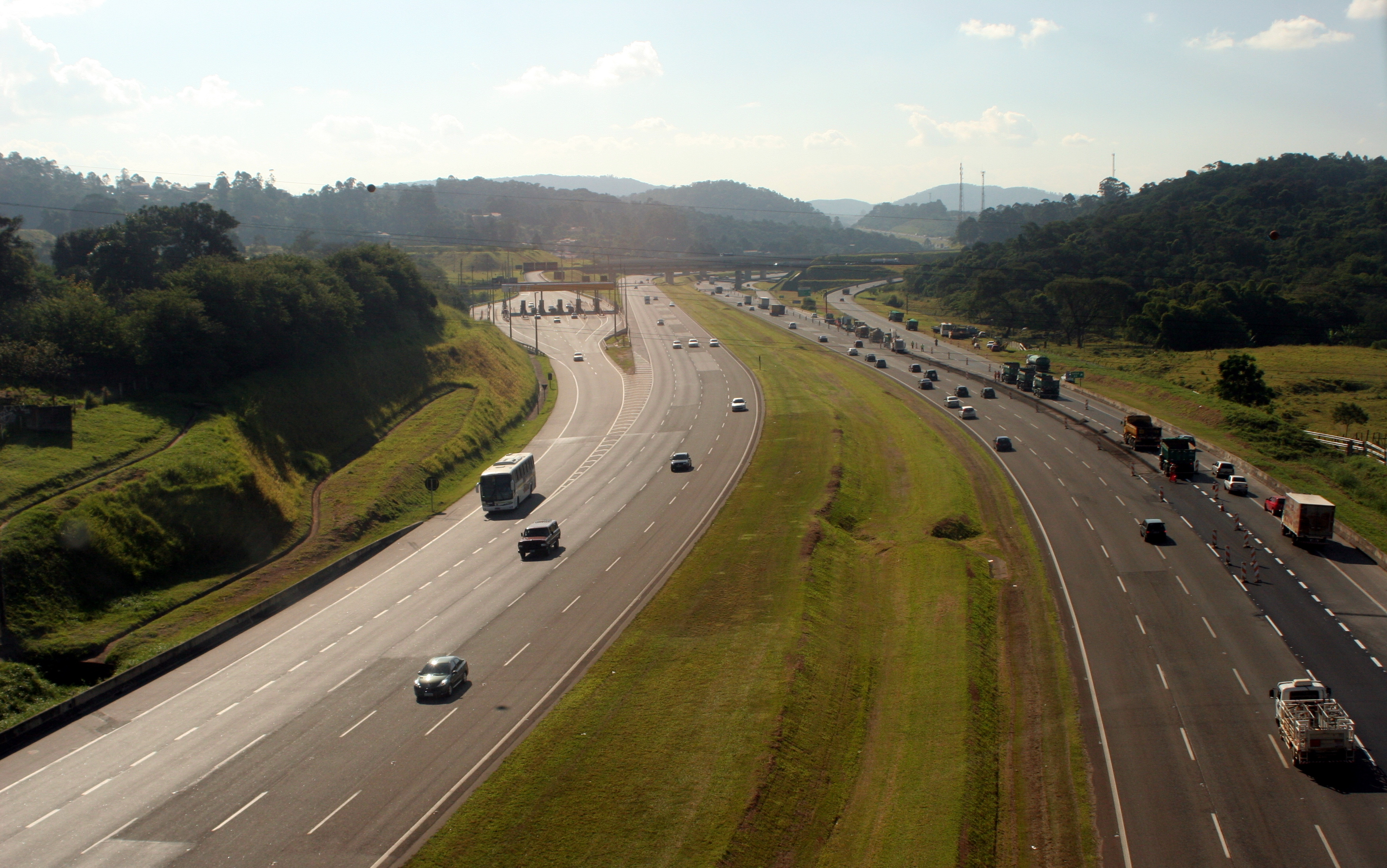
Rodovia dos Bandeirantes

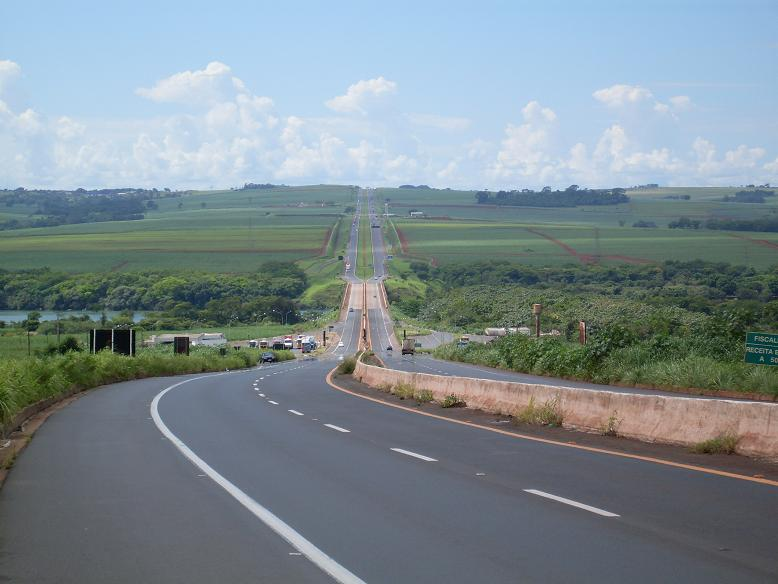
BR-050

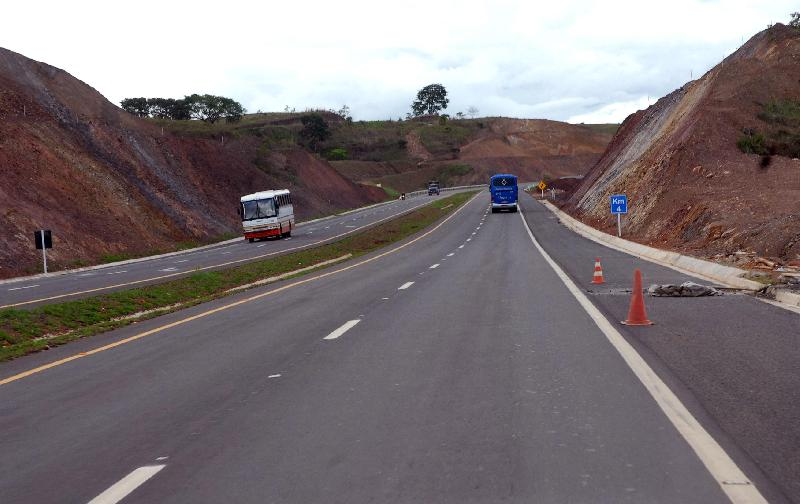
BR-060

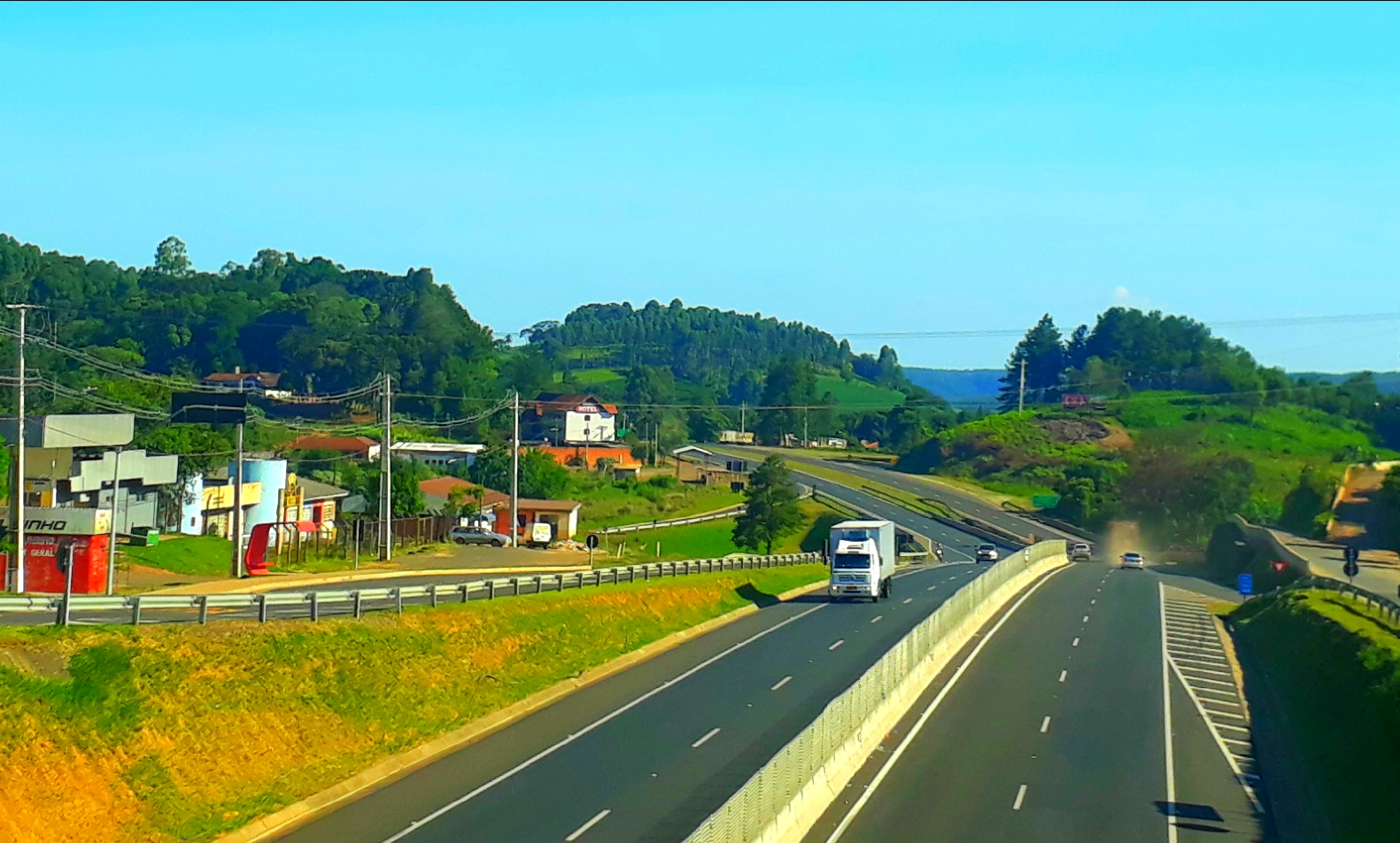
BR-376

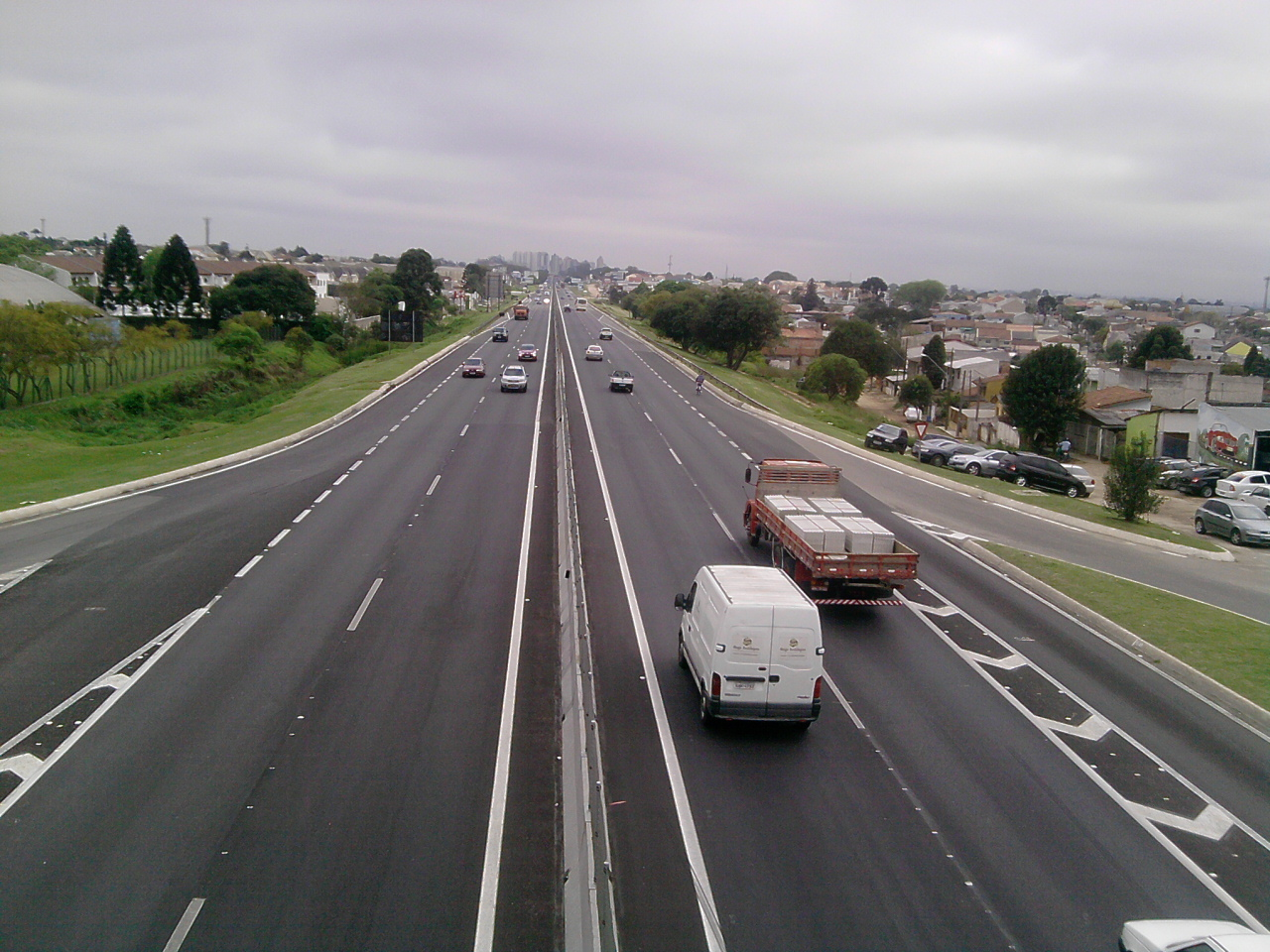
BR-277

Brazil has more than 1,720,700 km (1,069,193 mi) of roads, of which 213,452 km (132,633 mi) are paved (12,4%), and about 17,000 km (10,563 mi) are divided highways, 6,300 km (3,915 mi) only in the State of São Paulo. Currently it is possible to travel from Rio Grande, in the extreme south of the country, to Brasília (2,580 km (1,603 mi)) or Casimiro de Abreu, in the state of Rio de Janeiro (2,045 km (1,271 mi)), only on divided highways. The total of paved roads increased from 35,496 km (22,056 mi) in 1967 to 215,000 km (133,595 mi) in 2018. The two most important highways in the country are BR-101 and BR-116.

Although Brazil has the largest duplicated road network in Latin America, it's considered insufficient for the country's needs: in 2021, it was calculated that the ideal amount of duplicated roads would be something around from 35,000 km (21,748 mi) to 42,000 km (26,098 mi). The main road axes also have problems because they often have inadequate geometry and constructive characteristics that don't allow quality long-distance flow (non-interference from local traffic and high speed). The Brazilian Federal Government has never implemented a National Highway Plan at the same level as developed countries such as the US, Japan or European countries, which specifically aimed at inter-regional travel, and which should preferably be served by highways (which would differ from the common duplicated highways by geometric pattern, access control without access to neighboring lots, zero level crossings and returns, prohibition of circulation of non-motorized vehicles such as cyclists, animal traction or human propulsion, as per the Vienna Convention). The Brazilian State, despite some planning efforts, has been guided by a reactive action to the increase in demand (only duplicating some roads with old and inadequate layout) and not by a purposeful vision, directing occupation and economic density in the territory. Another problem is the lack of directing the Union Budget towards infrastructure works: in Brazil there is no law that guarantees funds from the Federal Budget for works on highways and other modes of transport (unlike what happens in sectors such as Education and Health), depending exclusively on the goodwill of the rulers. In the US, for example, the gasoline tax can only be used for transport infrastructure works. Brazil even invested 1.5% of the country's budget in infrastructure in the 1970s, being the time when the most investment was made in highways; but in the 1990s, only 0.1% of the budget was invested in this sector, maintaining an average of 0.5% in the 2000s and 2010, insufficient amounts for the construction of an adequate road network. For comparative purposes, the average investment of the US and the European Union was 1% between 1995 and 2013, even though they already have a much more advanced road infrastructure than Brazil.

The country has a medium rate of car ownership of 472 per 1000 people, however in comparison to the other developing economies of the BRIC group Brazil exceeds India and China.

The country still has several states where paved access to 100% of the state's municipalities has not yet been reached. Some states have 100% of cities with asphalt access, such as Santa Catarina, which reached this goal in 2014; Paraíba, which reached this goal in 2017, and Alagoas, which reached this goal in 2021 In states like Rio Grande do Sul, in 2020, there were still 54 cities without asphalt access. In Paraná, in 2021, there were still 4 cities without asphalt access. In Minas Gerais, in 2016, there were still 5 cities without asphalt access.

== Waterways ==
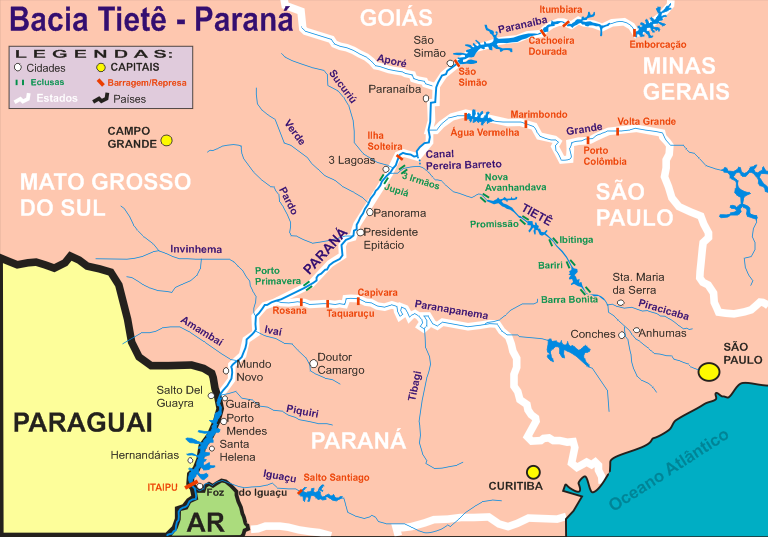
Tietê-Paraná Waterway

50,000 km navigable (most in areas remote from industry or population) (2012)

Among the main Brazilian waterways, two stand out: Hidrovia Tietê-Paraná (which has a length of 2,400 km, 1,600 on the Paraná River and 800 km on the Tietê River, draining agricultural production from the states of Mato Grosso, Mato Grosso do Sul, Goiás and part of Rondônia, Tocantins and Minas Gerais) and Hidrovia do Solimões-Amazonas (it has two sections: Solimões, which extends from Tabatinga to Manaus, with approximately 1600 km, and Amazonas, which extends from Manaus to Belém, with 1650 km. Almost entirely passenger transport from the Amazon plain is done by this waterway, in addition to practically all cargo transportation that is directed to the major regional centers of Belém and Manaus). In Brazil, this transport is still underutilized: the most important waterway stretches, from an economic point of view, are found in the Southeast and South of the country. Its full use still depends on the construction of locks, major dredging works and, mainly, of ports that allow intermodal integration.

== Pipelines ==
- condensate/gas 62 km
- natural gas 11,696 km (1,165 km distribution, 4,794 km transport)
- liquid petroleum gas 353 km (37 km distribution, 40 km transport)
- crude oil 4,517 km (1,985 km distribution)
- refined products 5,959 km (1,165 km distribution, 4,794 km transport)

== Seaports and harbors ==
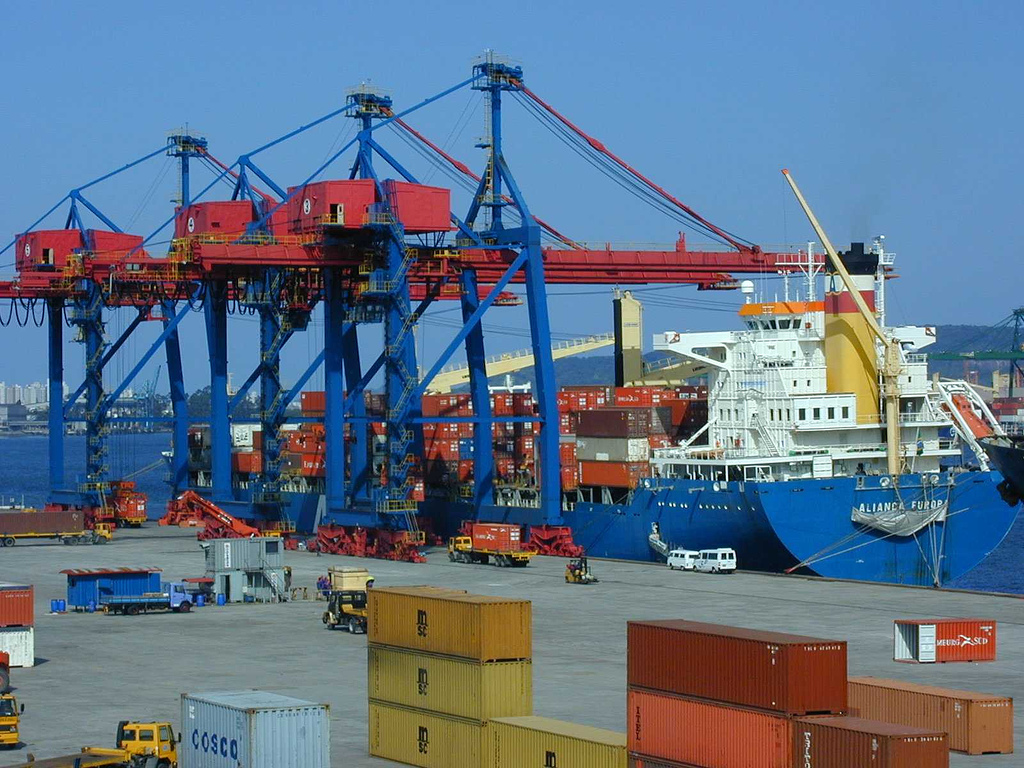
Port of Santos

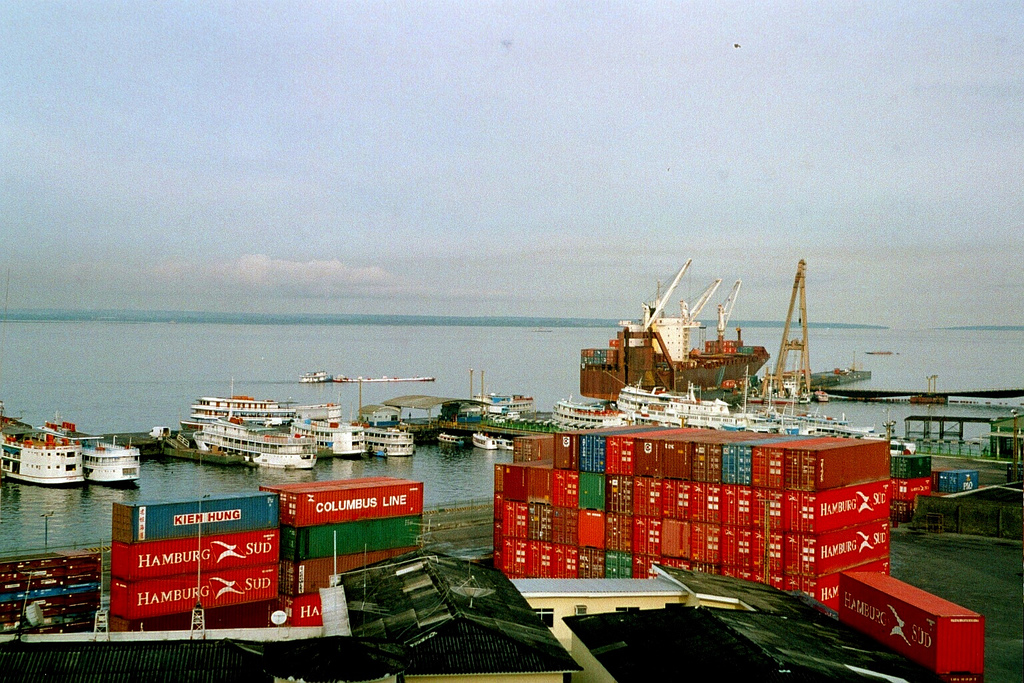
Port of Manaus on the Rio Negro, the largest river port in the country.

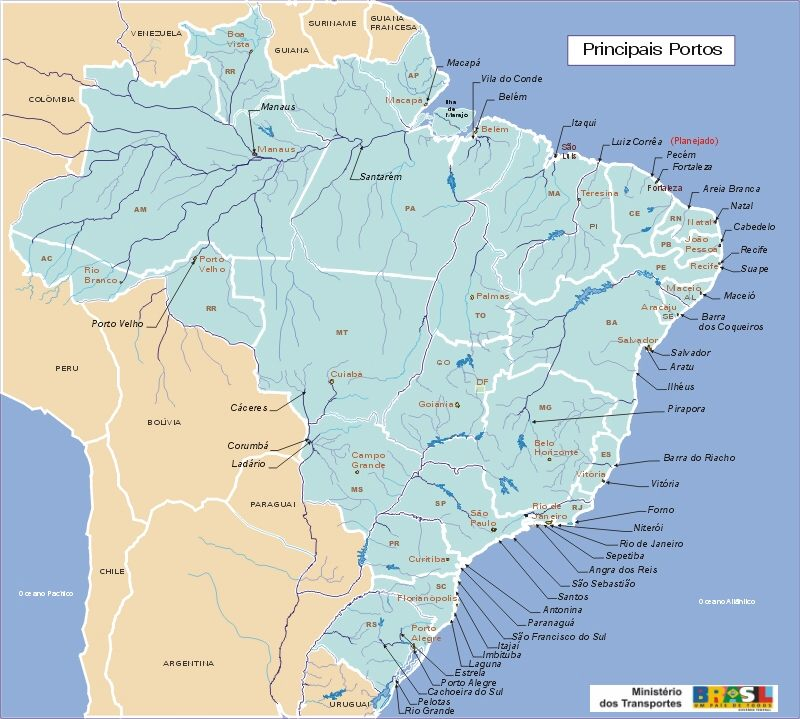
Main ports in Brazil

The busiest port in the country, and the 2nd busiest in all of Latin America, losing only to the Port of Colón, is the Port of Santos. Other high-movement ports are the Port of Rio de Janeiro, Port of Paranaguá, Port of Itajaí, Port of Rio Grande, Port of São Francisco do Sul and Suape Port.

=== Atlantic Ocean ===
- Santos
- Paranaguá
- Rio Grande
- Itajaí
- Tubarão
- Porto Alegre
- Suape
- Rio de Janeiro
- Pecém
- Ponta da Madeira
- Itaqui
- Antonina
- São Francisco do Sul
- São Sebastião
- Açu
- Salvador
- Natal
- Itaguaí

=== Amazon river ===
- Belém
- Manaus
- Santarém

=== Paraguay River (international water way) ===
- Corumbá

== Merchant marine ==
770 ships (1,000 gross tonnage (GT) (or over) totaling 3,964,808 GT/9,909,094 tonnes deadweight (DWT)

ships by type: (1999, 2019 and 2021 est.)

- bulk carriers 11
- cargo ships 42
- chemical tankers 7
- container ships 19
- gas carrying tankers 12
- multi-functional large load carrier 1
- passenger/cargo ships 1
- petroleum tanker 45
- roll-on/roll-off 1

== Airports ==
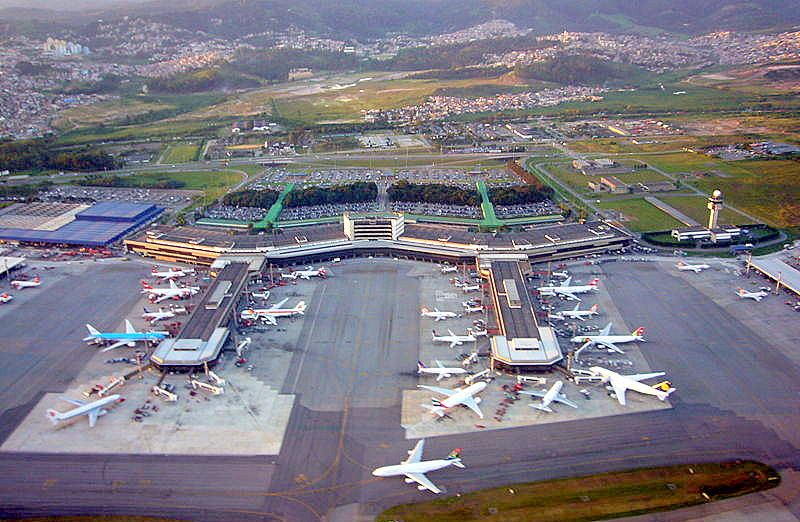
São Paulo–Guarulhos International Airport.

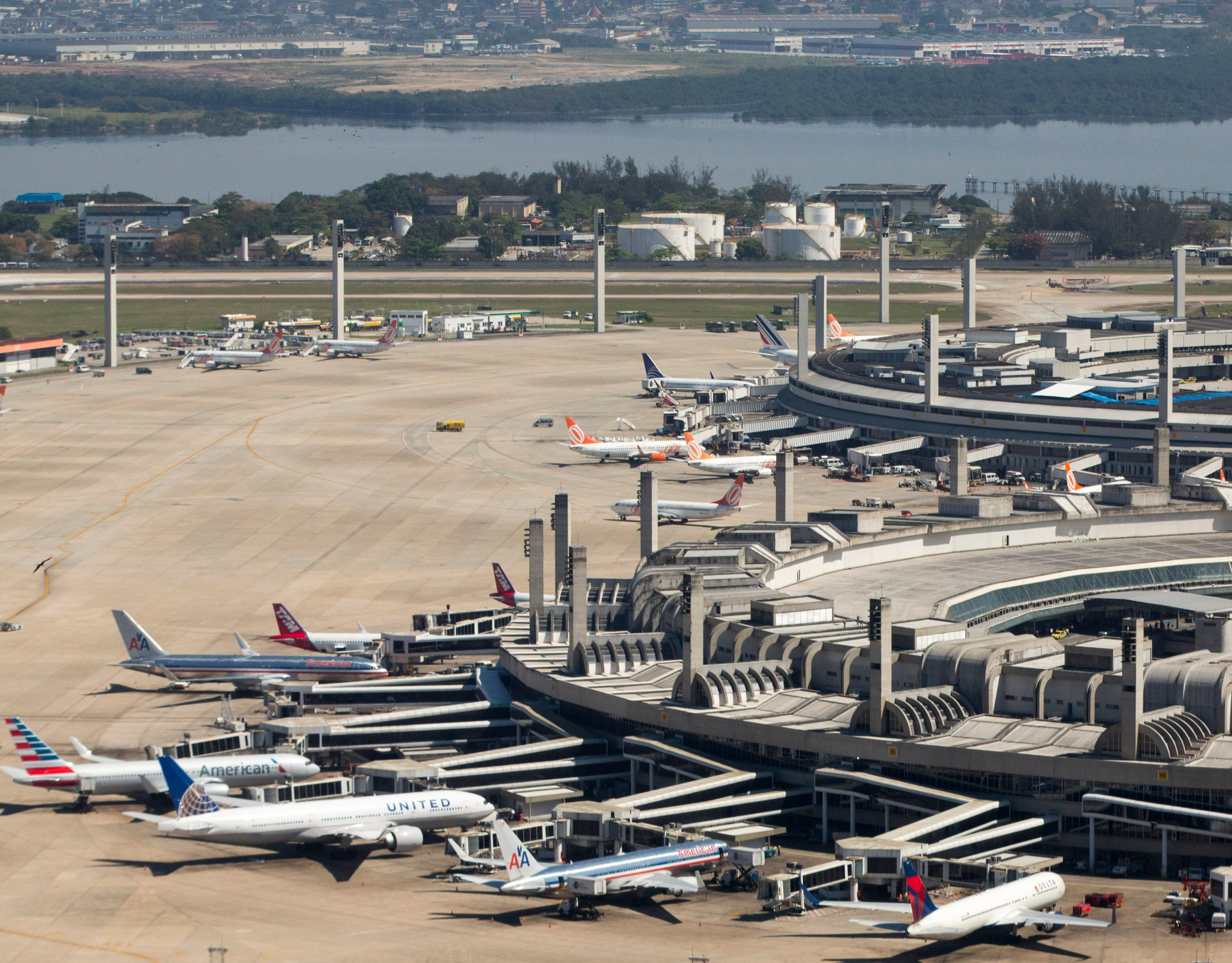
Rio de Janeiro-Galeão International Airport.

The country has the second largest number of airports in the world, behind only the United States. São Paulo/Guarulhos, is the largest and busiest in the country. Brazil has 37 international airports, such as those in Rio de Janeiro, Brasília, Belo Horizonte, Porto Alegre, Florianópolis, Cuiabá, Salvador, Recife, Fortaleza, Belém and Manaus, among others.

Most international flights must go to São Paulo–Guarulhos International Airport or Rio de Janeiro–Galeão International Airport. Belo Horizonte is the main international airport outside Rio de Janeiro and São Paulo. A few go to Brasília, Recife, Natal, and just recently Fortaleza has accepted international flights.

In the South American landscape, Brazil stands out for implementing railway and subway transport systems with direct connections to multiple international airports, facilitating passenger access and logistics. Notable examples include São Paulo–Guarulhos International Airport, connected via Line 13-Jade, Porto Alegre's Salgado Filho International Airport, with its Aeromovel integrated into Porto Alegre Metro, and Recife/Guararapes International Airport, with its own subway station. These initiatives position the country as one of the leaders in the region in terms of high-capacity airport-public transport integration.

As of 2020, Brazil had the eighth largest passenger air market in the world.

=== Airports - with paved runways ===
- total: 698
- over 3,047 m: 7
- 2,438 to 3,047 m: 27
- 1,524 to 2,437 m: 179
- 914 to 1,523 m: 436 (2017)
- under 914 m: 39 (2017)

=== Airports - with unpaved runways ===
- total: 3,395
- 1,524 to 2,437 m: 92
- 914 to 1,523 m: 1,619
- under 914 m: 1,684 (2013)

== Main airlines ==
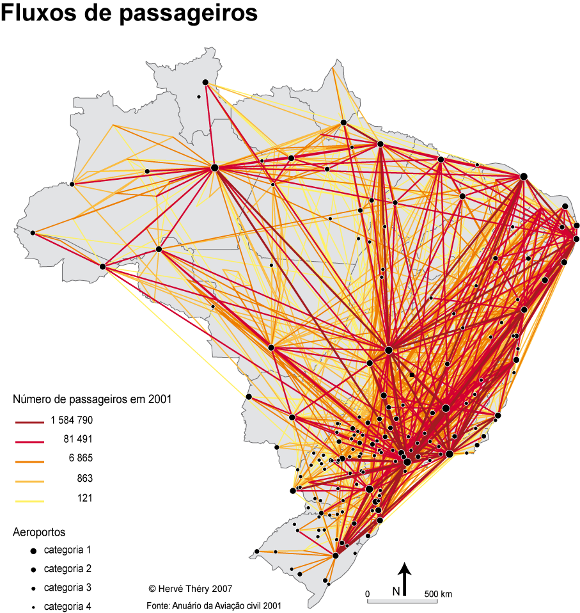
Passenger flow between the main airports in Brazil (2001).

- Azul Brazilian Airlines
- Gol Linhas Aéreas Inteligentes
- LATAM Brasil
- Voepass Linhas Aéreas

== Heliports ==
- 16 (2007)
- 13 (2010)
- 13 (2013)

== See also ==
- National Association of Cargo Transportation and Logistics (Brazil)
- Rail transport by country
- List of countries by road network size
