= BR-280 (Brazil highway) =

Highway in Brazil

BR-280

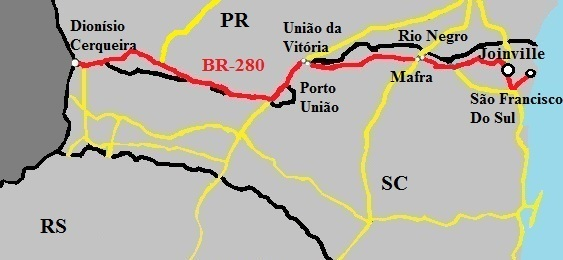

Route information
- Length: 642.2 km (399.0 mi)

Major junctions
- East end: São Francisco do Sul, Santa Catarina
- West end: Dionísio Cerqueira, Paraná

Location
- Country: Brazil

Highway system
- Highways in Brazil; Federal

BR-280 is a Brazilian federal highway that connects the cities of São Francisco do Sul, in the state of Santa Catarina, to Dionísio Cerqueira, in Paraná. It has a total length of 642.2 km.

Starting from São Francisco do Sul, it crosses important cities in the extreme north of Santa Catarina, such as Joinville, Araquari, Guaramirim, Jaraguá do Sul, Corupá, São Bento do Sul, Rio Negrinho, Mafra, Canoinhas and Porto União to the state of Paraná, in which it travels to the extreme south of that state, crossing other important municipalities such as Pato Branco, Palmas, Francisco Beltrão and Clevelândia.

The highway is very important in the region for the flow of agricultural crops and industrialized products, especially to the Port of São Francisco do Sul.

In the municipality of Mafra, the road reaches an altitude of almost 1,000 meters above sea level.

== Duplication ==
In April 2018, DNIT began working on the doubling of 74 km of BR-280, between São Francisco do Sul and Jaraguá do Sul. The project foresees a change in its route, which will stop passing through the central urban perimeter of Jaraguá do Sul, once again being a single lane near the border of this municipality with Corupá.

In August 2020, the first duplicated 5.5 km stretch of road was delivered.
