= Empresa Brasileira de Terminais Portuários =

Empresa Brasileira de Terminais Portuários (EMBRAPORT)
- Click on the map for a fullscreen view

Location
- Country: Brazil
- Location: Santos
- Coordinates: 23.922°S 46.317°W

Details
- Opened: July 2013
- Operated by: DP World
- Type of harbour: Multiuse
- No. of piers: 2

Statistics
- Website; Official website

Embraport, syllabic abbreviation of Empresa Brasileira de Terminais Portuários, is the largest multiple use private sector port terminal of Brasil. The port started operation in July 2013. the first stage of the port can handle 1.2 million TEU, with the second stage in operation it can handle 2 million TEU.

DP World and Brazil’s Odebrecht each own shares in the project through a joint venture called Coimex Investments Ports (CIP).

Embraport, is being erected near existing port facilities in Santos, in São Paulo (State). Santos is Brazil's largest container port, handling nearly 75 percent of the local trade and 25 percent of Brazil's foreign trade.
