= Santos Brasil =

Brazilian logistics company

Santos Brasil Participações S.A.
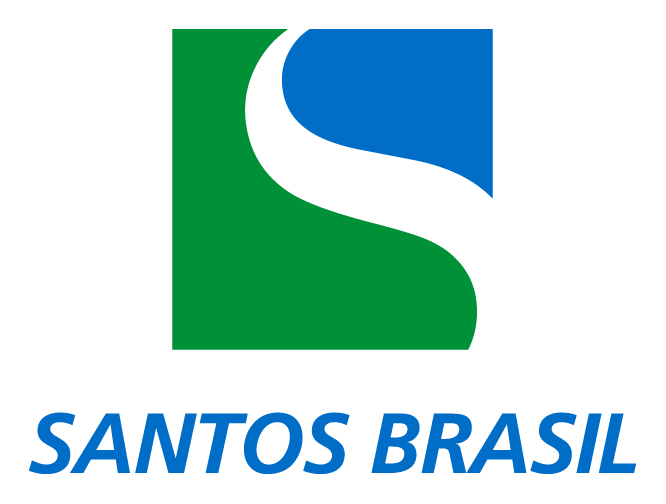
- Type: Sociedade Anônima
- Traded as: B3: STBP3
- Industry: Port Logistic
- Founded: 1997
- Headquarters: São Paulo, Brazil
- Area served: São Paulo, Guarujá, Santos, São Bernardo do Campo, Imbituba, Barcarena
- Number of employees: 3,600
- Website: www.santosbrasil.com.br

Santos Brasil Participações S/A is a Brazilian logistics company, streamlining operations with containers. Currently the organization is publicly traded (a corporation), listed on Level 2 of Bovespa's Corporate Governance, has a brAAA rating according to Standard & Poor's, and it has invested R$3 billion, calculated at present value, in the three container terminals that it administers. Among them is Tecon Santos, the largest container handler in Brazil and Latin America in yearly average with 80 MPH (movements per hour), which is located on the left margin of the Port of Santos, administered by the Companhia Docas do Estado de São Paulo (CODESP) under supervision of the Special Ports Department (SEP/PR), which is responsible for most of the incoming and outgoing flow of goods in Brazil. Headquartered in São Paulo, it was established in 1997 and has a concession to operate not only Tecon Santos, but also Tecon Imbituba at the Port of Imbituba in Santa Catarina, Tecon Vila do Conde in the city of Barcarena in the state of Pará, the TEV - Vehicle Terminal at the Port of Santos, as well as the General Cargo Terminal, also in Imbituba. The company also has two distribution centers: the DCs São Bernardo in the city of São Bernardo do Campo in the Greater São Paulo City Region, and in Jaguaré, also in the city of São Paulo. It also has a logistics operator, Santos Brasil Logística, that administers the Industrial Logistics and Customs Clearance Centers - CLIA Guarujá and CLIA Santos on the coast. The company develops various projects of social-environmental responsibility and focused on sports, and is recognized as a Company Friends of Sports by the Ministry of Sports.

== Company's corporate structure ==
Shareholders	%
International Market Investments C.V.	26,57%
PW237 Participações S. A.	20,48%
Multi STS Participações S. A.	10,16%
Brasil Terminais S.A	8,16%
Santander Fundo de Investimento PB RK Exclusivo Ações	1,90%
OPP I Fundo de Investimentos em Ações	0,49%
Richard Klien	0,17%
Outros	0,43%
Free Float	31,64%

== Company's History ==
=== 1997 ===
Santos Brasil begins by winning a consortium of the privatization bid of the Santos Container Terminal, Tecon Santos, with an investment of US$250 million, under the name "Consórcio Santos Brasil".

=== 2001 ===
Tecon Santos totals 760 meters of mooring berth with the incorporation of 250 meters to the 510 original meters.

=== 2006 ===
Due to a corporate restructuring, the holding Santos Brasil Participações S/A is born with shares publicly traded on the São Paulo Stock Exchange (Bovespa), offering port and logistics services throughout the country. Through the Permission to Use - TPU instrument, the company begins to operate the TEV, Vehicle Terminal, at the Port of Santos.

=== 2007 ===
The holding incorporates the company "Nova Logística S/A", the operator of Mesquita Soluções Logísticas, beyond the services offered by "Santos Brasil S/A". 19.7% of the containers handled along the Brazilian coast pass through Tecon Santos, the company's terminal on the left margin of the Port of Santos. The building projects to expand Tecon Santos begin, which will give the location 980 meters of mooring berth.

=== 2008 ===
The productivity at Tecon Santos, measured by Movements per Hour (MPH), reaches the mark of 55 MPH. The rate was 11 MPH in 1997 when Santos Brasil took on the terminal's operation.

The company wins the bid to manage Tecon Imbituba at the Port of Imbituba. The process was conducted by Companhia Docas de Imbituba.

In the same year it wins the right to administer Tecon Vila do Conde at Vila do Conde Port in Barcarena, Pará

=== 2009 ===
Tecon Santos, which is operated by the company, receives the first Super Post-Panamax container cranes (super cranes on rails that run along the docks and are able to move two 40-foot containers simultaneously) on the American continent.

In partnership with the Iochpe Institute, the Santos Brasil Formare School is created to train young people from Santos to work with port and logistics operations.

Through its subsidiary Union Armazenagem e Operações Portuária S.A., the company wins the bid to lease the Vehicle Terminal - TEV.

=== 2010 ===
Based on a study of institutional positioning, the company revises its logo and its entire visual communication. The mooring berth at Tecon Santos is expanded to 980 meters with the opening of Terminal 4 (T4). The area was purchased where today the Jaguaré DC is located on the west side of the city of São Paulo.

=== 2011 ===
Tecon Imbituba receives container cranes from China and has its mooring berth expanded to 660 meters.

Tecon Santos crosses a milestone in Brazil with 135.5 MPH (movements per hour) on a single vessel.

=== 2012 ===
Tecon Santos breaks a record in Brazil with 81.86 MPH (movements per hour) in a single month. In the same year, the terminal breaks another record in the Brazilian port sector, this time in handling: 105,000 containers in a single month.

As an alternative transport in Pará, inland river transport of containers via barge to other cities in the region was initiated.

=== 2013 ===
The company reached a 55% market share in the Port of Santos.

Standard & Poor's raises the organization's rating to "brAAA", which is the highest level for the Brazil National Scale.

Tecon Santos receives a vessel with the highest cargo capacity in the history of the Port of Santos. The Cap San Nicolas, belonging to Hamburg Süd, with 9,600 TEU (Twenty-foot Equivalent Unit).

== Structure ==
=== Tecon Santos ===
Situated on the left margin of the Port of Santos, it is considered a benchmark in matters of efficiency in South America and holds the highest average MPH (movements per hour) in Latin America: 81.86. The terminal has 596,000 square meters and a capacity to handle 2 million TEUs per year.

on administrated by Santos Brasil is located at the Port of Imbituba and has 207,000 square meters and a capacity of 650,000 TEUs per year. This terminal is located on a deep-water port and can receive Super Post Panamax type vessels. It also has an Industrial Port, a joint ownership cargo storage area of 2.5 million m^{2} for cold storage, management yard for trucks, among other structures.

=== Tecon Vila do Conde ===
In the north of the country, in Barcarena, is located Tecon Vila do Conde with a capacity of 250,000 TEU per year, 103 square meters of floor area, and 254 meters of mooring berth.

== Logistics ==
The company operates Distribution Centers in São Paulo and São Bernardo do Campo as well as Industrial Logistics and Customs Clearance Centers (CLIAs) in Santos and Guarujá. It also offers Port-to-Door Services with integration of port, ground transportation, and industrial supply activities.

== Social and Environmental Responsibility ==
The Santos Brasil Formare School is a project developed together with Iochpe Foundation (Fundação Iochpe) in partnership with the company. Since 2011 it has offered to young people from Santos openings for vocational courses recognized by MEC in port and logistics areas. The classes are taught by volunteer staff called formare educators.

The company supports the Right Whale Project, an NGO based in Imbituba - Santa Catarina that works for the preservation and identification of southern right whales, a species that is in danger of extinction.

In Santos, other work is carried out in partnership with various entities such as Partners in Education, Ilos Institute, and Warriors Without Weapons (Guerreiros sem Armas). These are projects specific for the communities surrounding the company's operations with actions related to sports, culture, sustainability, and community development.

== Awards ==
- Best Annual Report - 11th Abrasca Award (Brazilian Association of Listed Companies) - Category - Open Capital Company Group 2
- Best Container Terminal - Maritime Guide Award 21 Years
- Best Port Operator - Maritime Guide Award 21 Years
- Best Company in the Infrastructure sector - Época 360° Award
- Best Communications with the Press - Negócios da Comunicação Magazine Award
- SGS ICS Certification - Integrated Management System ISO 9001:2008, ISO 14001:2004, and OHSAS 18001:2007
- Prêmio Jabuti (Jabuti Award): The Port of Santos and the History of Brazil

== See also ==
- Transport in Brazil
- Right whale
