= Customs House, Manaus =

Architectural complex in Manaus, Amazonas, Brazil

Customs House of Manaus
- Alfândega de Manaus
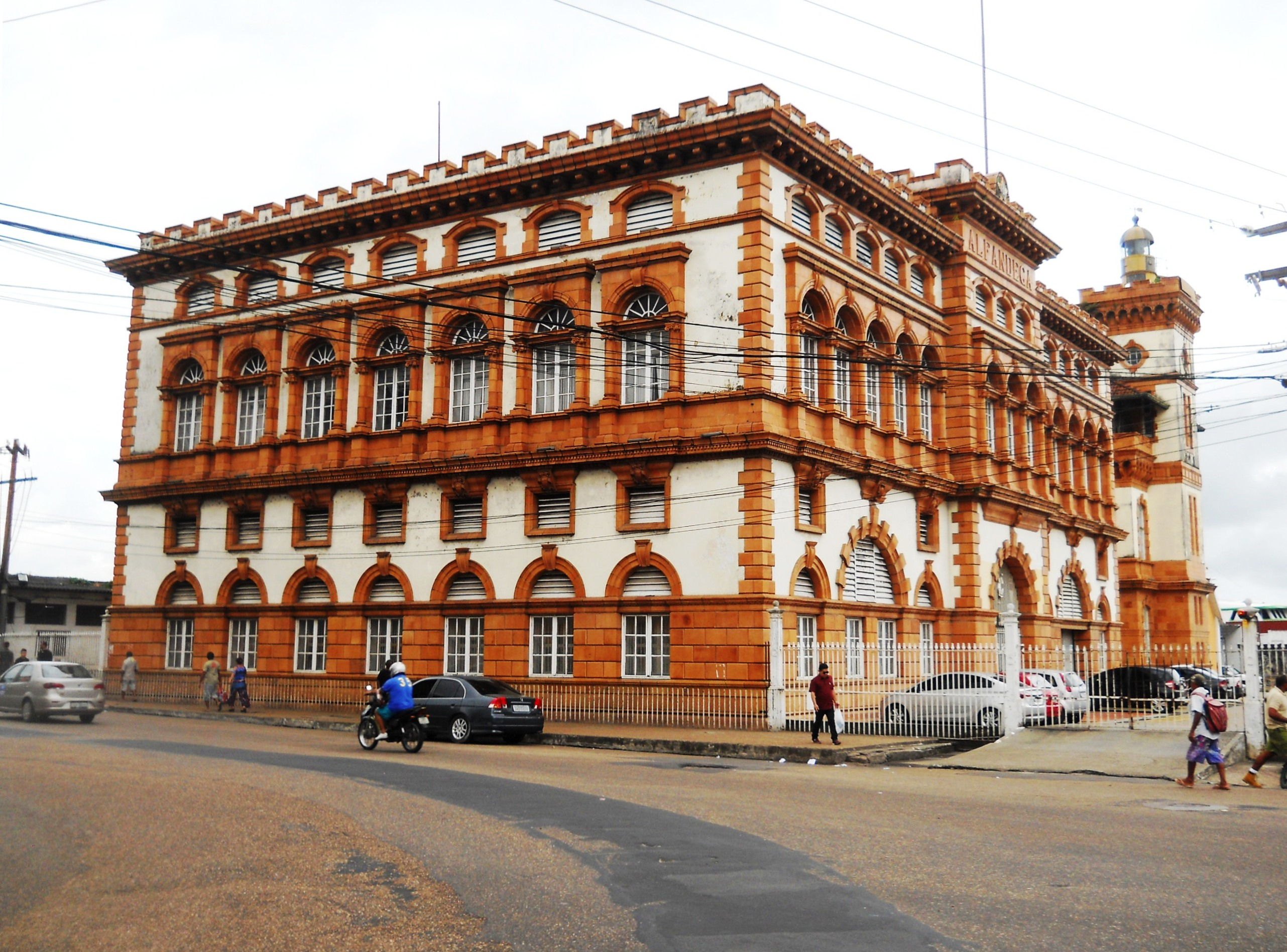
- Facade of the Customs House; in the background, the Guardamoria
- Interactive map of the Customs House of Manaus area
- Alternative names: Port and Customs Complex of Manaus

General information
- Type: Customs
- Architectural style: Eclectic, medieval and renaissance
- Location: Manaus, Amazonas; Brazil
- Coordinates: 013°08′14.8″S 60°01′30.4″W
- Construction started: 1906; 120 years ago
- Inaugurated: January 1909, 17; 117 years ago
- Owner: Internal Revenue Service

Design and construction
- Architects: Edmund Fisher; H.M. Fletcher; G. Pinkerton
- Architecture firm: B. Rymkiewcz; Manaos Harbour Limited

Other information
- Number of stores: 2

The Customs House of Manaus (Portuguese: Alfândega de Manaus), or Alfândega e Guardamoria, is an architectural complex composed of two buildings located in the center of the city, capital of Amazonas, in Brazil. It was built in the first decade of the 20th century and is currently part of the Architectural Complex of the Port of Manaus, listed as a national historic site in 1987. Both buildings were constructed by the English firm Manaos Harbour Limited as part of the concession contract for the city's port.

The buildings were constructed in the eclectic style with a mixture of medievalist and Renaissance elements. Prefabricated exposed brick blocks imported from England were used as a reproduction of London's edifices from the early 20th century.

== History ==
At the end of the 19th century, Manaus, at the peak of the rubber cycle, developed several plans to manage the city's growth. In 1899, preparations began for the improvement of the Port of Manaus in order to optimize the transportation of products.

In 1900, the Federal Government signed a contract with B. Rymkierwiez & Cia, which transferred the project to the English firm Manaos Harbour Limited. Originally, the main building was designed to function as a general office on the lower floor and a directors' residence on the upper floor. However, one of the clauses in the signed deal stated that "the construction and donation of the necessary and appropriate building for the administration of the Customs House" was mandatory. The floor plan and budget, drafted by architects Edmund Fisher, H.M. Fletcher and G. Pinkerton, were ready in 1903, but construction began in 1906.

The Guardamoria, built in the same period and architectural style, was attached to the Customs House to provide fiscal policing in the ports and on board ships. It has a tower with a steel lighthouse which, at the time, produced a strong illumination due to its electric arc lighting. However, it was only inaugurated three years later, on January 17, 1909; work on the port was completed at the end of the 1910s.

== See also ==
- Port of Manaus
- Amazon rubber cycle
