= Acaraí State Park =

State park in Santa Catarina, Brazil

- Parque Estadual do Acaraí
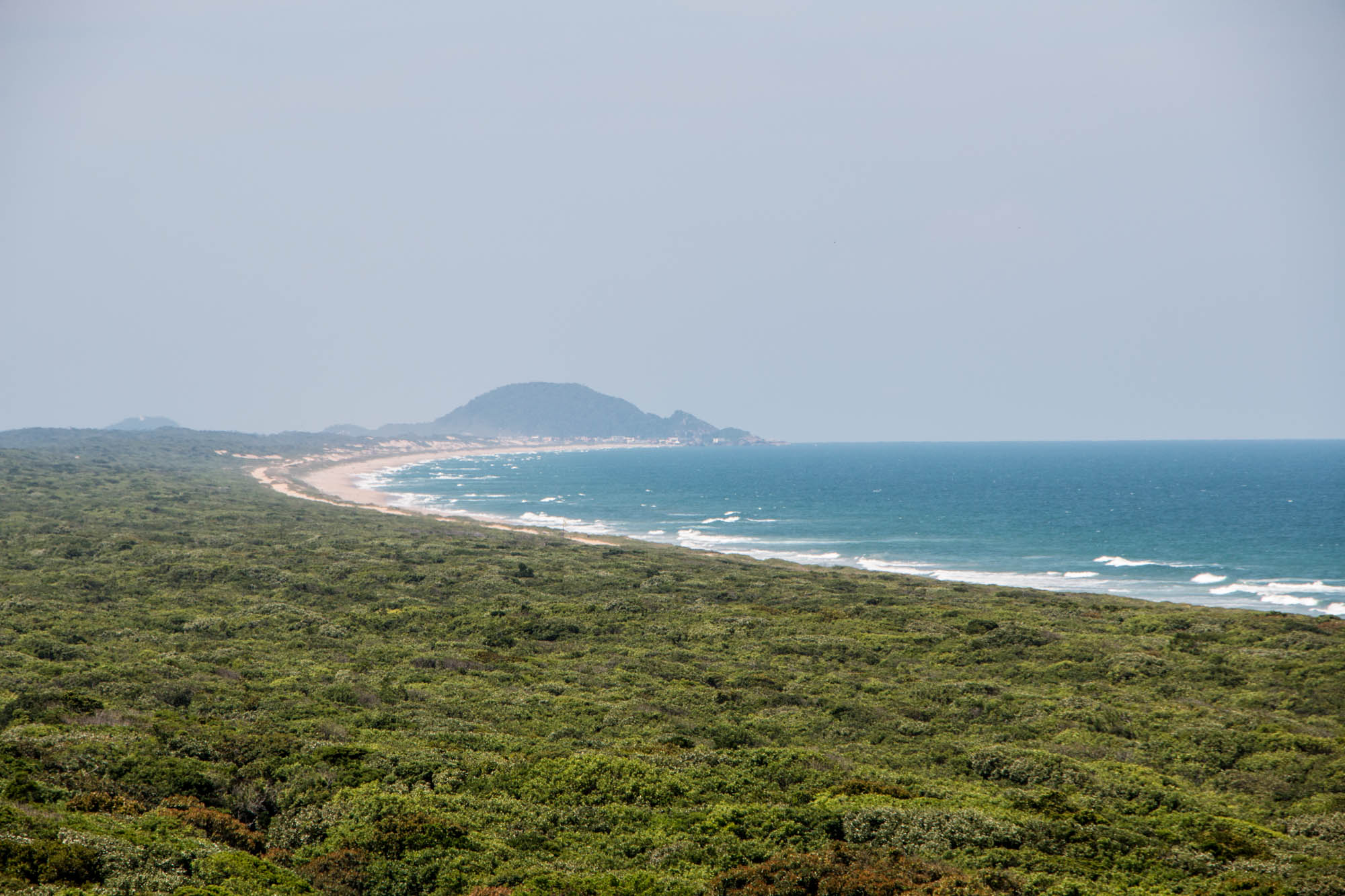
- View of the park and the Praia Grande

- Location within Brazil
- Nearest city: São Francisco do Sul, Santa Catarina
- Coordinates: 26.297304°S 48.552090°W
- Area: 6,667 hectares (16,470 acres)
- Designation: State park
- Created: 23 September 2005
- Administrator: FATMA

The Acaraí State Park (Portuguese: Parque Estadual do Acaraí) is a state park in the state of Santa Catarina, Brazil. It protects a coastal area in the Atlantic Forest biome. There are issues due to a sizeable population of traditional residents in the park.

== Location ==
The Acaraí State Park is in the municipality of São Francisco do Sul, Santa Catarina. It has an area of about 6,667 hectares (16,470 acres) on the coastal plain of the island of São Francisco, and includes the Tamboretes archipelago. It protects one of the most important continuous remnants of coastal ecosystems in the state, the Praia Grande restinga.

== History ==
The park has its origins in the creation of a municipal commission created in 2002 to discuss implementing a conservation unit. The process was kicked off by municipal decree 109 of March 2002 with government and civil society representatives. The park was created by state decree 3.517 of 23 September 2005 with the goal of preserving an area of Atlantic Forest with scenic beauty and biodiversity, and to increase knowledge of pre-colonial and colonial history.

The steelmaker Vega do Sul paid R$10,100,000 as environmental compensation when it was established in São Francisco do Sul in the early 2000s. This money was to be used to compensate the owners of over 1,000 small lots in the park, with priority for the elderly or seriously ill, people with well-documented ownership and people who lived in the park before it was created. A 2007 paper argued that the category should be changed to a sustainable development reserve due to the presence of an indigenous population within the park.

The park's management plan was published on 13 October 2014, providing guidance to the consultative council on deployment of the park.

== Environment ==
The vegetation in the Acaraí State Park is predominantly dense lowland rainforest, with some dense submontane rainforest on two small, isolated elevations, and dense alluvial rainforest on some banks of the Acaraí River. In addition, there are large areas of pioneer formations of marine and fluvial influence, dunes, restinga and mangroves in the estuarine areas. The water complex formed by the Acaraí River, the sources of the Perequê River and the Capivaru Lagoon give shelter, food and breeding areas for several aquatic species. The restinga and lowland Atlantic Forest protect flora and fauna, including endemic and endangered species.

Fauna identified to date include 337 species of birds, 35 of reptiles (5 sea turtles, 1 freshwater turtle, 1 crocodilian, 6 lizards, 1 amphisbaenid and 19 snakes). 17 of amphibians, 20 of non-flying mammals and 38 of fish in the Acaraí River. The park also includes the Tamboretes Archipelago, four islands that provide a breeding area for several species of birds.

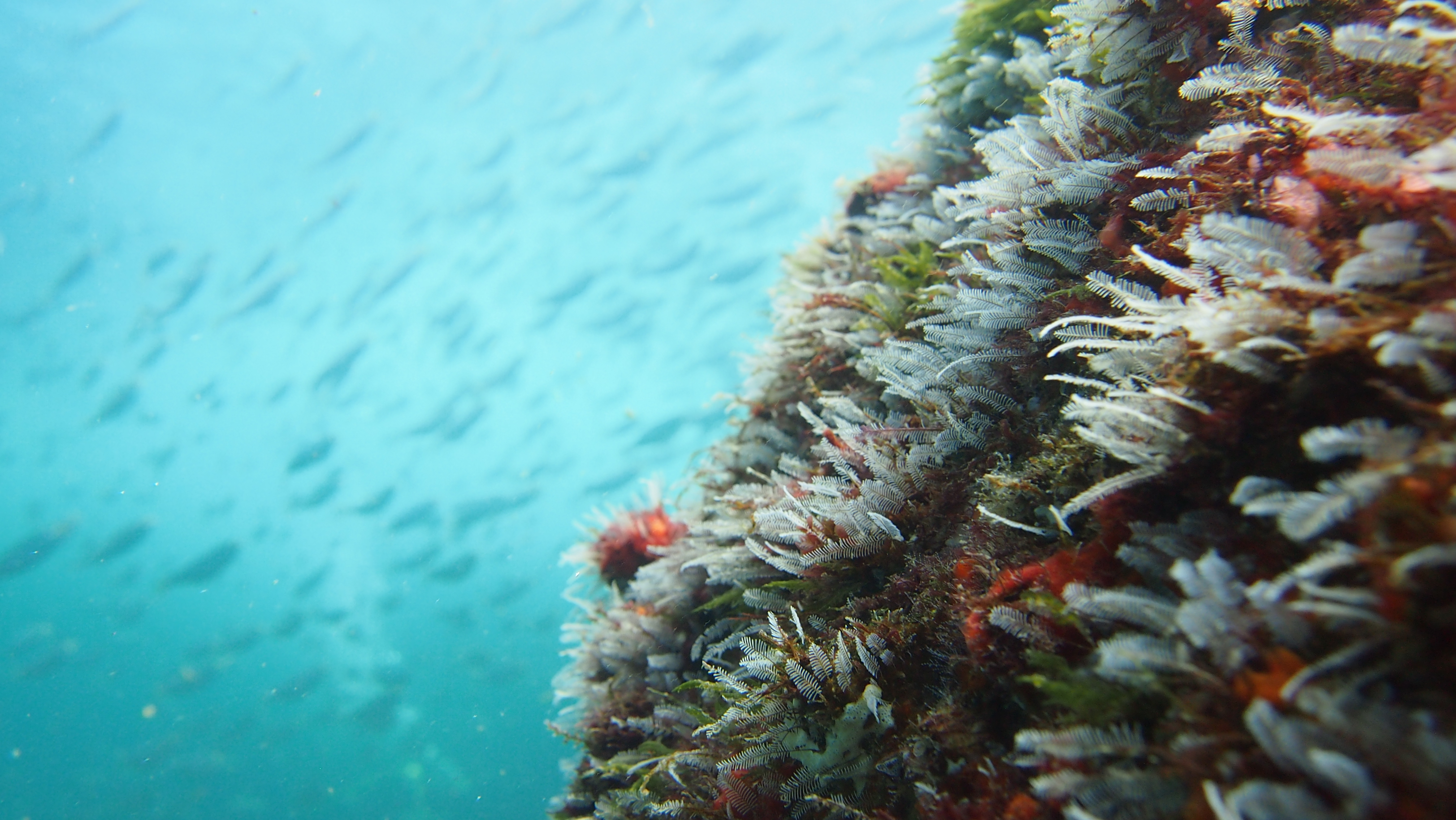
Underwater life beside the Tamboretes Archipelago

== Human activities ==
As of 2016 there were plans to build an administrative headquarters and visitor center. The park staff give lectures in schools in the region and take groups of students on educational activities inside the park. The park is used for research, including studies of the macaco-prego, benthic fauna and fish. The islands are off limits to visitors, and in a buffer zone of 50 metres (160 ft) around the islands fishing and underwater hunting are prohibited, but diving to view the rich marine fauna is allowed.

Hunting, logging and fishing are allowed only for the traditional population of the park. Efforts are being made to control invasive species such as pines. In the high season of summer the integrity of the park is threatened by tourists who ride trail bikes and drive jeeps through the dunes.

== Sources ==
- Gomes, Anderson (24 October 2014), "Plano de manejo de parque em São Francisco do Sul é publicado no Diário Oficial da União", Notícias do Dia (in Portuguese)
- Kreidlow, Rogerio (26 November 2013), "Donos de terras do Parque Acaraí, em São Francisco do Sul, tem até dia 8 para pedir indenização", A Notícia
- Parque Estadual Acaraí (in Portuguese), FATMA, archived from the original on 2019-09-04
- Rocha, Eduarda Alcione da Silva Kirchchoff da (September 2007), "Uma análise sobre a possibilidade de recategorização do Parque Estadual do Acaraí em São Francisco do Sul" (PDF), Revista Âmbito Jurídico, X (45), Rio Grande
