= National Association of Cargo Transportation and Logistics =

The Brazilian National Association of Cargo Transport and Logistics (pt-BR, "Associação Nacional do Transporte de Cargas e Logística"; NTC&Logistica, or simply NTC) is a Brazilian organisation founded in 1963 by Orlando Monteiro and based in São Paulo, with a branch in Brasília. This association represents cargo carriers and logistical operators. From its foundation until the mid-1990s, it represented only road cargo transport companies, but later it expanded its services to other transport modals, as well as to logistical operators (stocking and storage). It is also responsible for calculating the Brazilian National Index of Transport Costs (INCT), which measures variations in costs incurred of the transport sector throughout the country. It gives a prize annually to companies for providing the best services to transport businesses (vehicles, suppliers, and others), through a satisfaction survey developed by Brazilian statistical institute Datafolha.

After the Treaty of Asunción, NTC also began working in Argentina, Bolivia, Chile, Paraguay, Peru and Uruguay.
