= Port of São Francisco do Sul =

Port in Brazil

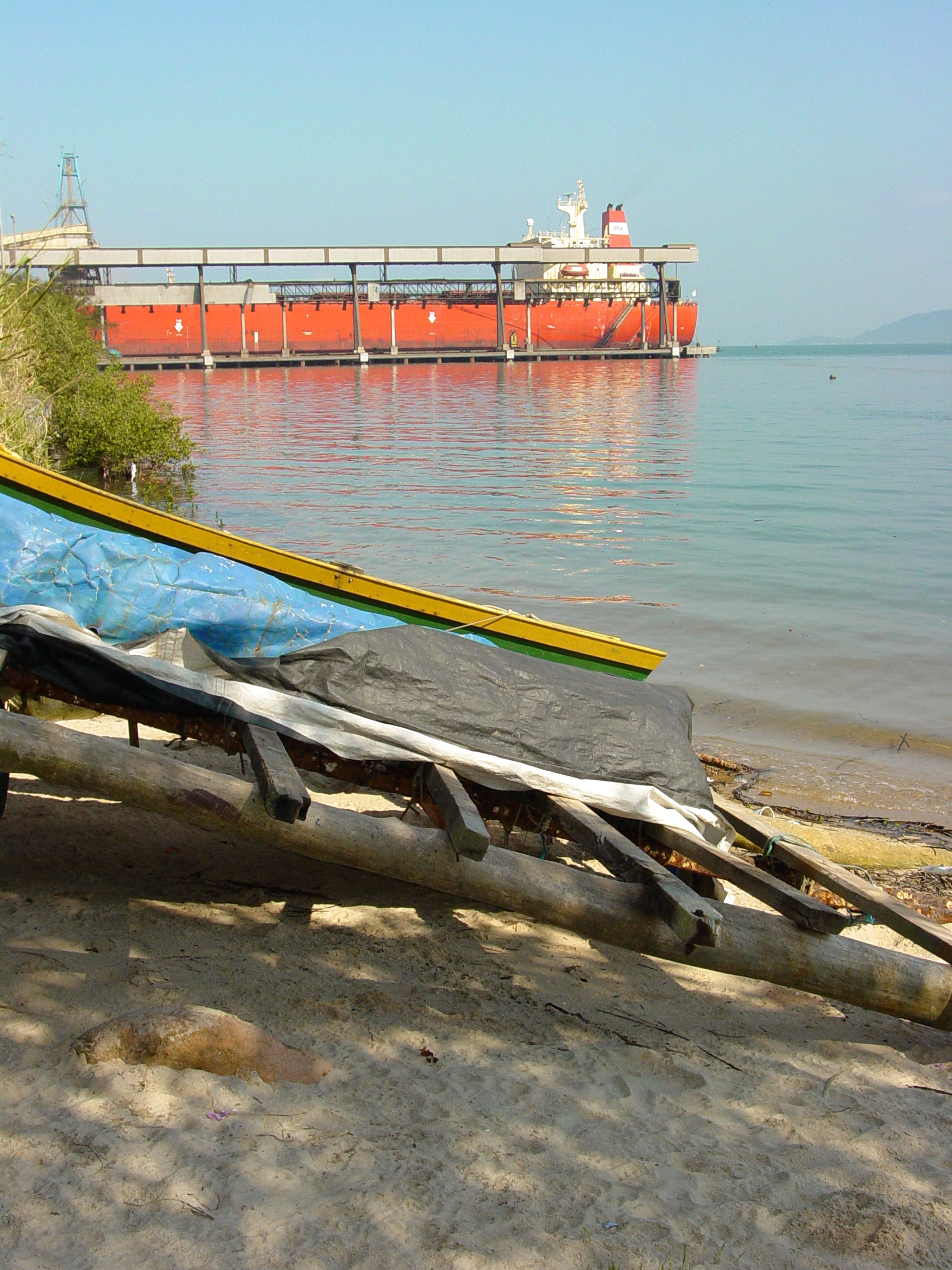
- Interactive map of Port of São Francisco do Sul

Location
- Country: Brazil
- Location: São Francisco do Sul, Santa Catarina
- Coordinates: 26°14′14″S 48°38′11″W

Details
- Opened: July 1, 1955
- Type of Harbor: Seaport

Statistics
- Annual cargo tonnage: 13,6 million tonnes (2021)

The Port of São Francisco do Sul is one of the main ports of Brazil and Latin America. It's located in the city of São Francisco do Sul, in the Brazilian state of Santa Catarina. It's the largest port for cargo handling in Santa Catarina and the seventh largest in Brazil.

== Data ==
The land access system to the port is made up of BR-280, BR-101 and BR-116. The railway compositions enter and leave the port through the 485 railway, which connects São Francisco do Sul with the city of Mafra, 167 kilometers away.

Responsible for 25.61% of the cargo handled by the ports of Santa Catarina, receiving an average of 38.6 ships per month, and handling general cargo of 11.4 million tons in 2018. Currently, the unit is managed by SCPar Porto de São Francisco do Sul and operated by Cidasc.

In terms of natural structure, the Port of São Francisco do Sul has an access channel 9.3 miles long, 150 meters wide and 13 meters deep. With a tidal range of 2 meters, the evolution basin is very wide. There are 5 official anchorage areas. In terms of installed infrastructure, the Port of São Francisco do Sul has a berth 780 meters long and 43 feet deep. Still forming part of the port complex, the Babitonga Terminal, owned by the private sector, has a 225-meter-long berth with a maximum draft of 11 meters. An electronic signaling system covers the 9.3 miles of the access channel and the evolution basin, being the second Brazilian port with this international standard. The buoy and tower system, meanwhile, works with solar energy and has an autonomy of up to 30 days. The tower withstands winds of up to 200 km / h, which guarantees precision and safety when navigating through the port.

== History ==
The history of the port dates back to the 1940s, when the Federal Government issued a decree on March 1, 1941 granting the concession to the Government of Santa Catarina for the construction and operation of a port in historic São Francisco do Sul. Four Years later, in 1945, the works began, which were completed ten years later. The port was inaugurated on July 1, 1955.

Before having wood and yerba mate as the main exported products, today the Port of São Francisco do Sul - in operation together with the Santa Catarina Port Terminal (leased in 1996 and operating since 2001) - is the 3rd largest mobilizer in solid bulk from the south of the country and exports of steel products; cellulose pulp and fertilizers.
