= Port of Manaus =

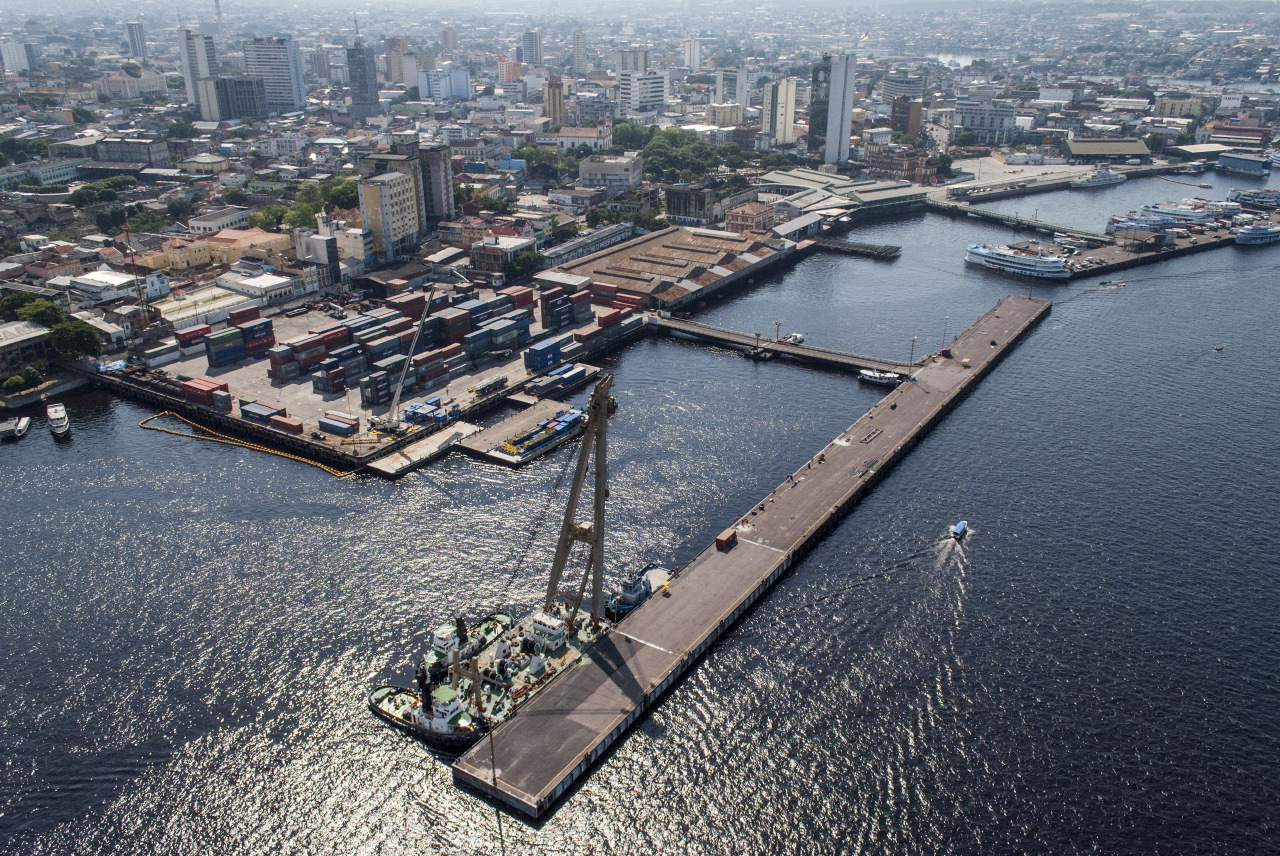
- View of The Port of Manaus
- Interactive map of Port of Manaus

Location
- Country: Brazil
- Location: Manaus, Amazonas
- Coordinates: 3°8′35″S 60°1′1″W

Details
- Opened: 1907
- Type of harbour: River
- Size: Medium
- Port Director: Alessandro Bronze

Statistics
- Annual cargo tonnage: 10.6 million tonnes (2018)
- Website portodemanaus.com.br

The Port of Manaus is a riverport located on the Rio Negro in Manaus, Amazonas, Brazil. The Port of Manaus is an important commercial center for ocean-going vessels traveling the Amazon, being the main transport hub for the entire upper Amazon basin. It imports beef from the hinterlands and exports hides and leather. Important industries in the Port of Manaus include manufacturing of soap, chemicals, electronics equipment as well as shipbuilding, brewing, and petroleum refining.

Several mobile phone companies have manufacturing plants in the Port of Manaus, and other major electronics manufacturers have plants there. Major exports include Brazil nuts, chemicals, petroleum, electrical equipment, and forest products, and eco-tourism is an increasingly important source of income for the city. The recent discovery of petroleum in the area brings great promise of further wealth and commerce to the Port of Manaus.

With so much industry and commerce, the Port of Manaus has become a sophisticated cosmopolitan center. Located next to the Amazon rainforest, it also attracts crowds of tourists who find a variety of land and boat trips into the jungle. Wildlife is plentiful, even within the city, and it is home to the pied tamarin, one of Brazil's most endangered primates. Tour boats take visitors to see the point where the black waters of the Rio Negro meet the Solimões River's brown waters, flowing together without mixing for nine kilometers. Tourists can find many hotels in the jungle where they can enjoy nature in comfort.

== History ==
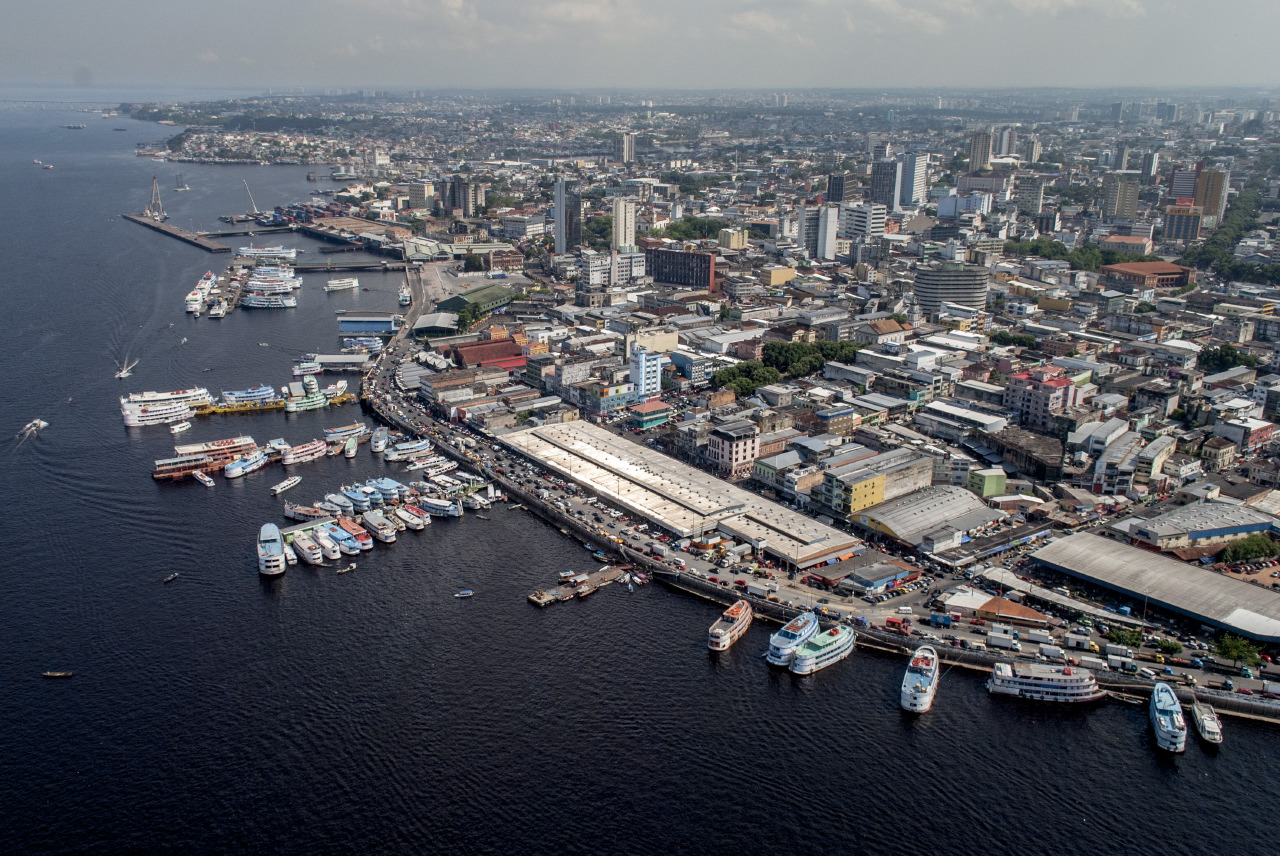
Aerial view of Port of Manaus, 2012

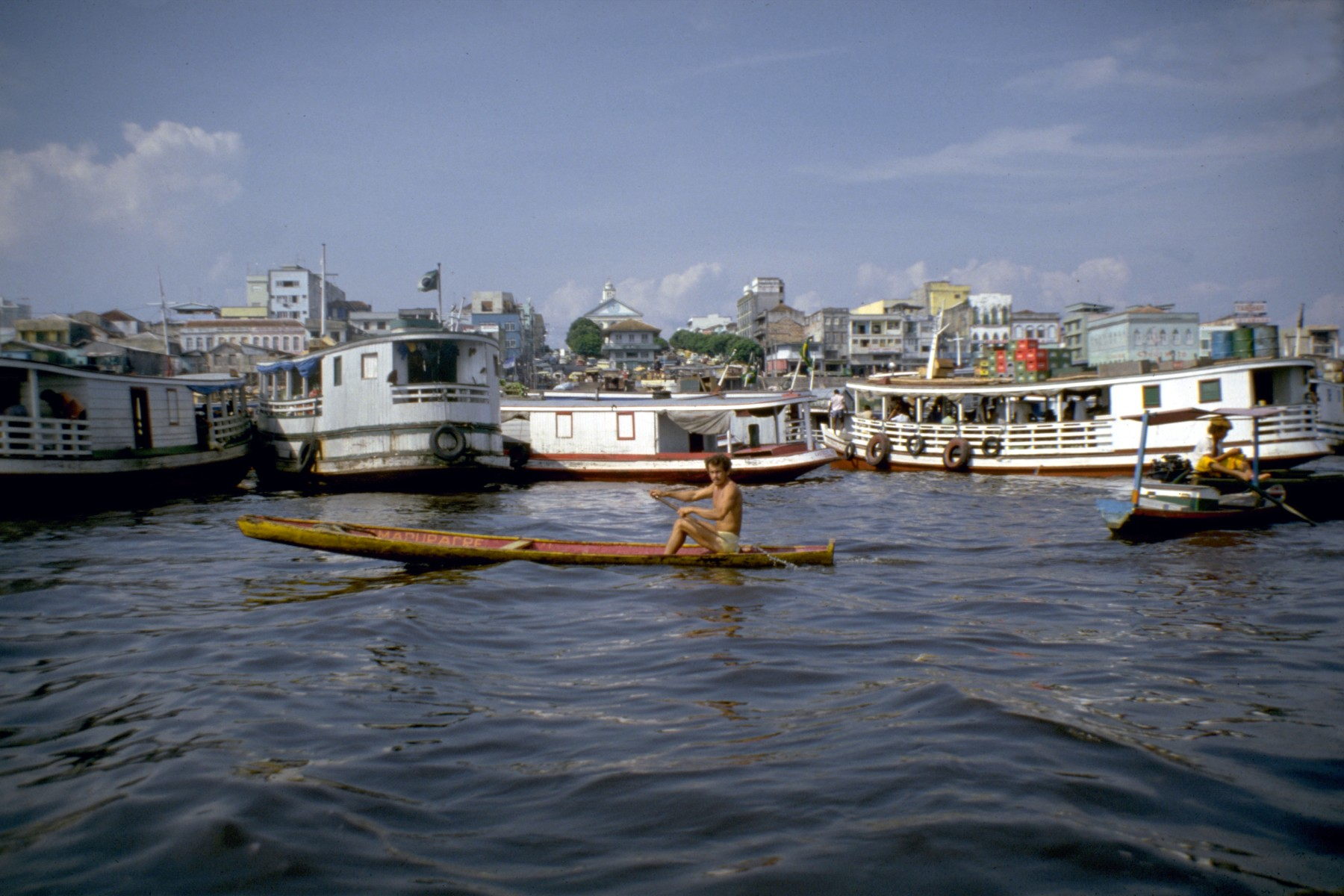
Port of Manaus, 1979. In the background the Paróquia Nossa Senhora dos Remédios.

Europeans first settled the Port of Manaus by building a small fort in 1669. A Christian mission and small village called Villa de Barra grew up around the fort. In 1809 the town was called Barcelos. In 1850 it was renamed Manaos after a local Indian river tribe, and became the capital of the Rio Negro region and of the Amazonas province. The natural rubber industry brought an economic boom to the Amazon region that lasted from the late 19th century to about 1920. Manaus acquired magnificent houses and other buildings, including a dramatic opera house. The port's commerce began in that period with the need to ship rubber products downriver to the Atlantic Ocean.

Manaus was one of the first cities in Brazil to have electricity. The Polish engineer Bronisław Rymkiewicz and his company began to improve port facilities in 1892. They added a customs house, a stone quay, storage, and floating wharves. Many of the buildings were ordered from Europe. Amazonas state Governor Silvério José Néri enforced processing of rubber in Amazonas, rather than shipping the raw rubber downstream to Pará to be processed for export. In June 1903 he inaugurated the Port of Manaus] operated by the Manaus Harbour limited company. He also funded new shipping lines serving various ports in the interior.

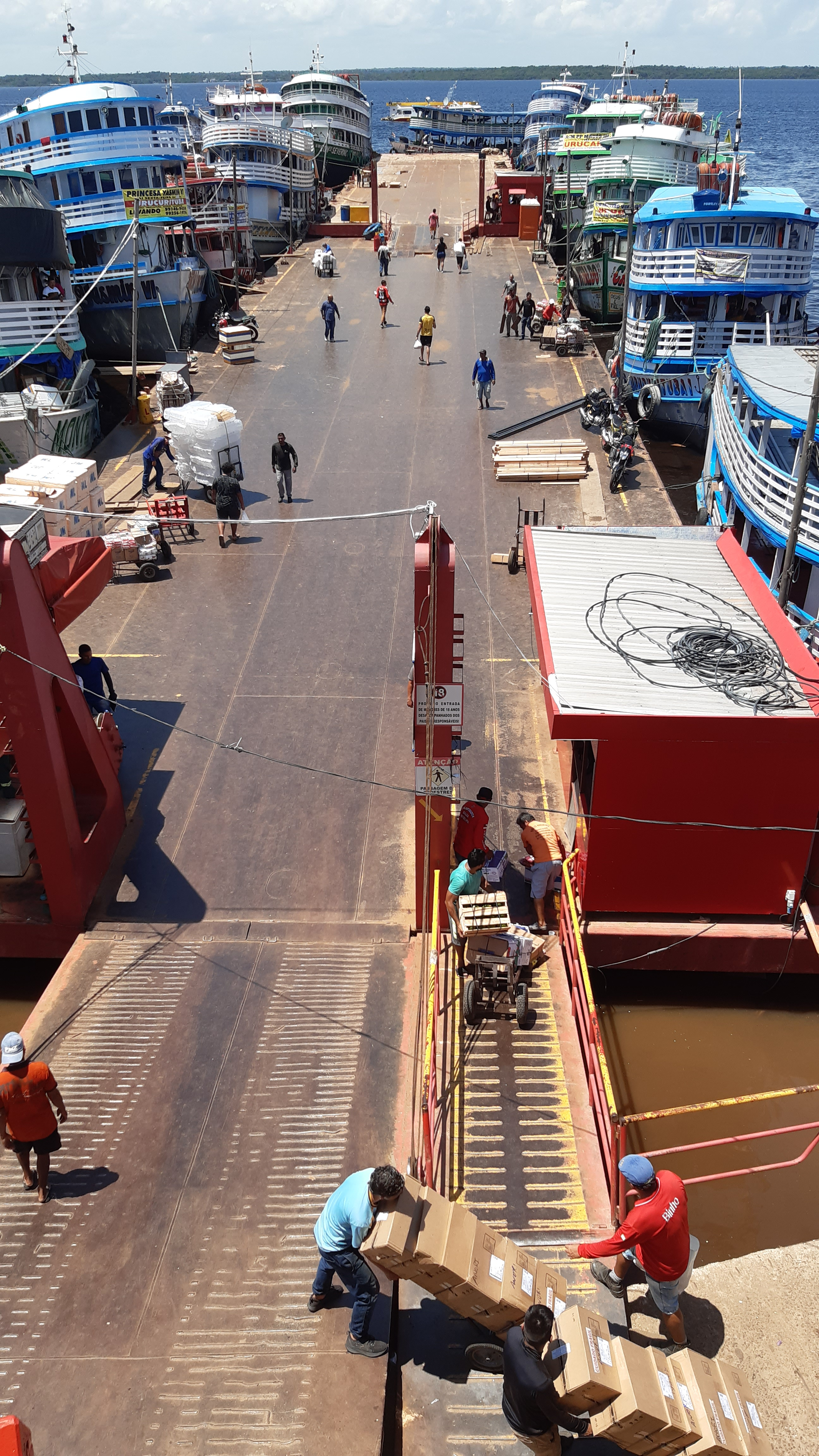
Operations at Manaus Port, February 2024

When the rubber market collapsed in the 1920s, the Port of Manaus declined and did not recover until 1967 when it was made a duty-free zone. The city has been called Manaus from 1939. In the late 1970s, the area saw devastating deforestation as the Brazilian government and private interests exploited mineral and agricultural resources. Brazil's government built a fishing terminal in the Port of Manaus.

== See also ==
- History of Manaus
