= Port of Itajaí =

Port in the city of Itajaí, Brazil

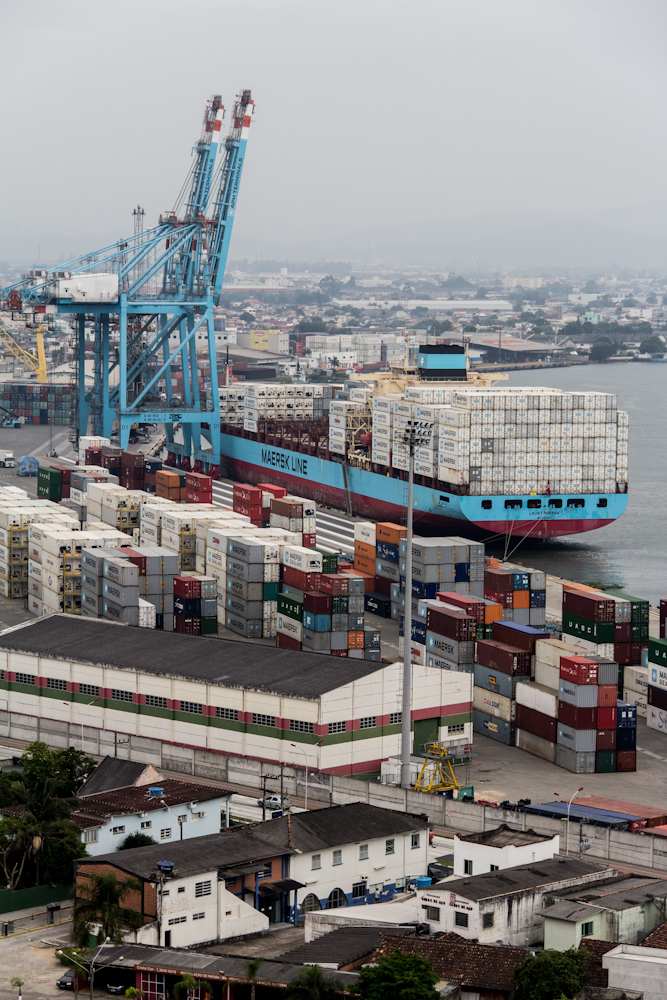
- View of one of the port terminals
- Interactive map of Port of Itajaí

Location
- Country: Brazil
- Location: Itajaí, Santa Catarina
- Coordinates: 26°55′00″S 48°38′00″W

Details
- Opened: 1938
- Type of Harbor: Seaport
- Size: 152.000 m^{2}

Statistics
- Annual cargo tonnage: 18.9 million tonnes (2021)

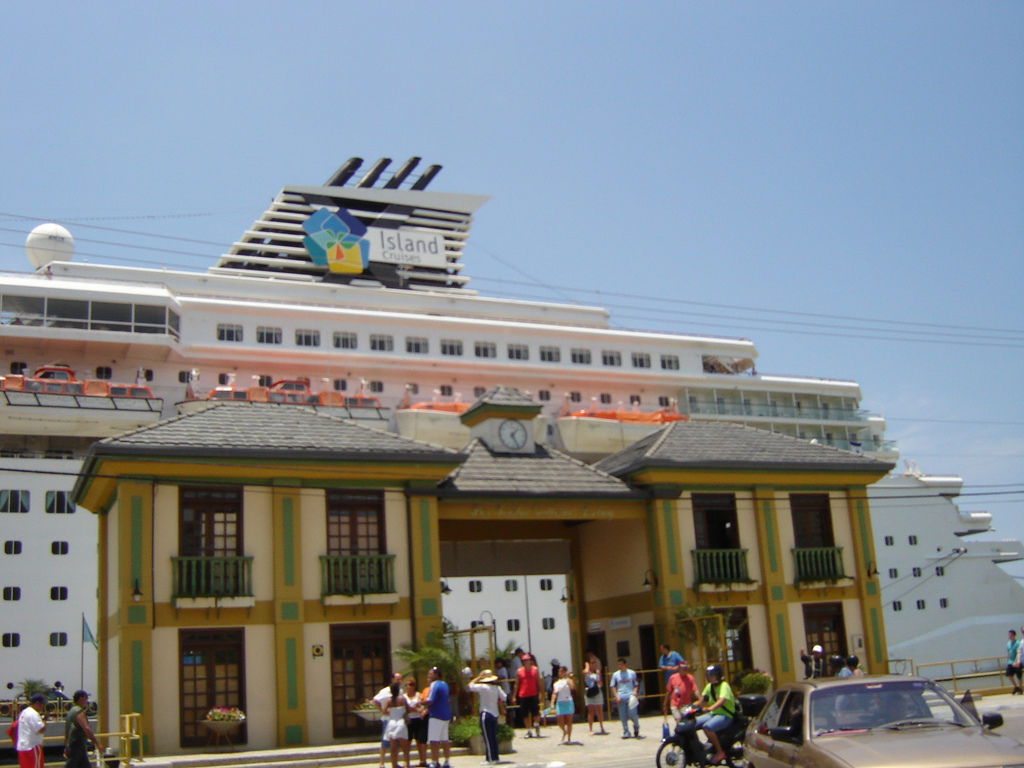
Itajaí pier with moored cruise ship

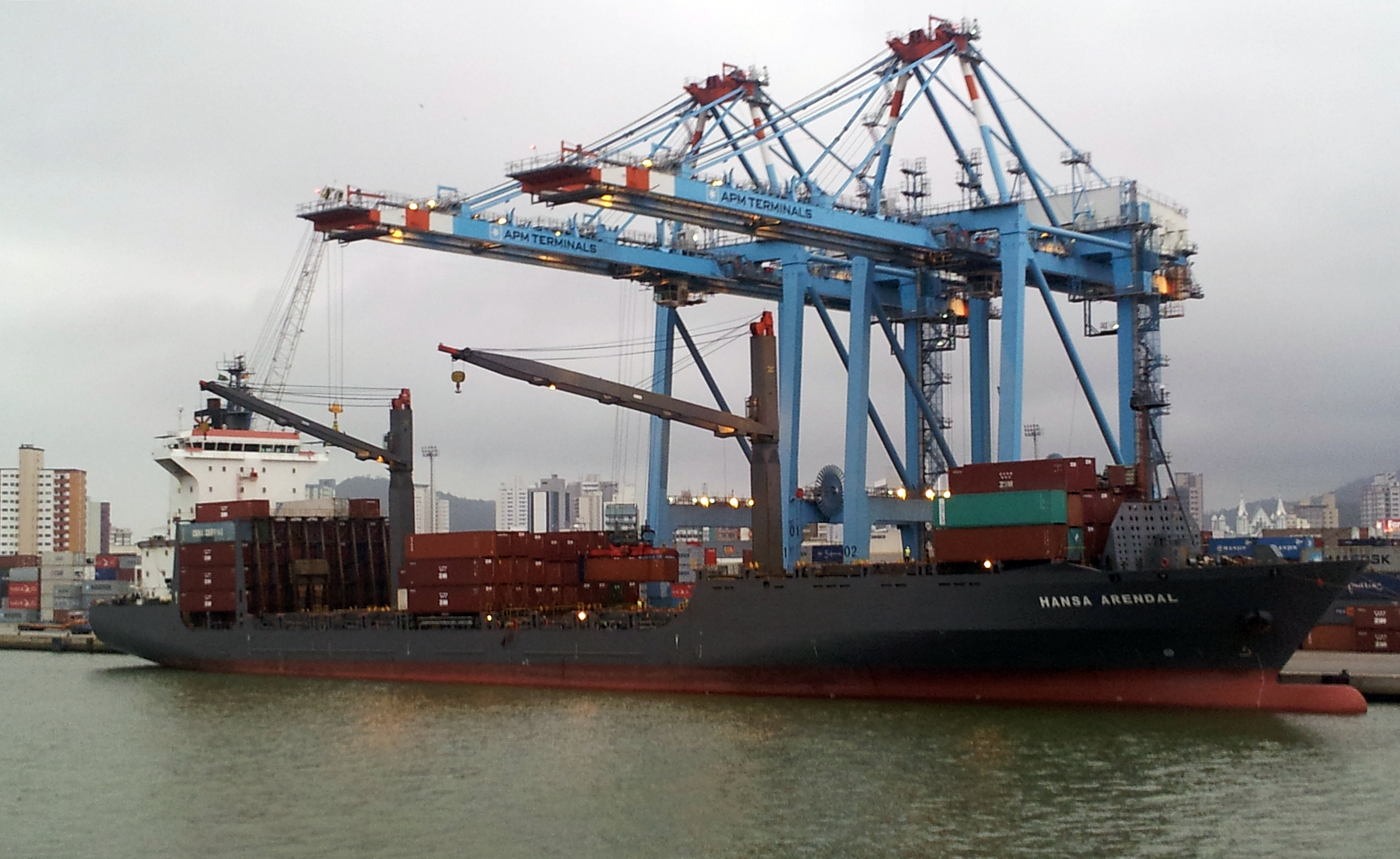
Cargo ship moored in port

The Port of Itajaí is one of the main ports of Brazil and Latin America. It's located on the Itajaí-Açu river in the city of Itajaí, in the Brazilian state of Santa Catarina. In container handling, it's the 2nd largest port in Brazil; leads the ranking among exporters of frozen products. In imports, the main products are machinery, engines and equipment.

== Data ==
The land access system to the port is made up of BR-470, BR-101 and BR-486. It's administered by the superintendent of the port of Itajaí, the municipal authority of the prefecture of Itajaí. Its area of influence is made up of the states of Santa Catarina, Rio Grande do Sul, Paraná, Mato Grosso, Mato Grosso do Sul and São Paulo.

Since the mid-19th century, Itajaí had warehouses for the movement of goods, and from 1905 studies were developed to define new port facilities for the location. On July 17, 1912, construction of a wharf in the southern part of the mouth of the Itajaí-Açu river began, and on May 14, 1938, construction of a 233 m wharf began. Subsequently, this wharf was extended in 1950 and 1956, increasing by 470 m, and four warehouses were built from 1950 to 1964, one of them for refrigerated freight.

By Decree No. 58,780 of June 28, 1966, the Board of Directors of the Port of Itajaí was constituted, which replaced the "Tax Inspection of the Ports of São Francisco do Sul and Itajaí", in the administration of the Department. national ports. and waterways.

With the creation of the Empresa de Portos do Brasil S.A. (Portobrás), authorized by Law No. 6,222 of July 10, 1975, the entity related to it, the Port Authority of Itajaí, was created. With the extinction of Portobrás in 1990, the administration of the port was transferred to the Companhia Docas do Estado de São Paulo (Codesp). Since June 2, 1995, by a decentralization agreement, the port was administered by the municipality of Itajaí. Subsequently, by means of a delegation agreement of December 1, 1997, which entered into force on January 1, 1998, the Municipality of Itajaí was confirmed as the authority for the exploration of the port, through the administration Hidroviária Docas Catarinense (ADHOC). Finally, municipal law n ° 3 513 of 6 June 2000 of the municipality of Itajaí, transformed the body into a municipal autarchy, with the name of superintendency of the port of Itajaí to administer the referred port.

Over the past few years, the main goods handled by the Port of Itajaí were: wood and derivatives; frozen chickens (largest export port in Brazil); ceramic; kraft paper; machines and accessories; tobacco; vehicles, textiles; sugar and frozen meat.
