= São Francisco do Sul =

- Municipality
- Municipality of São Francisco do Sul
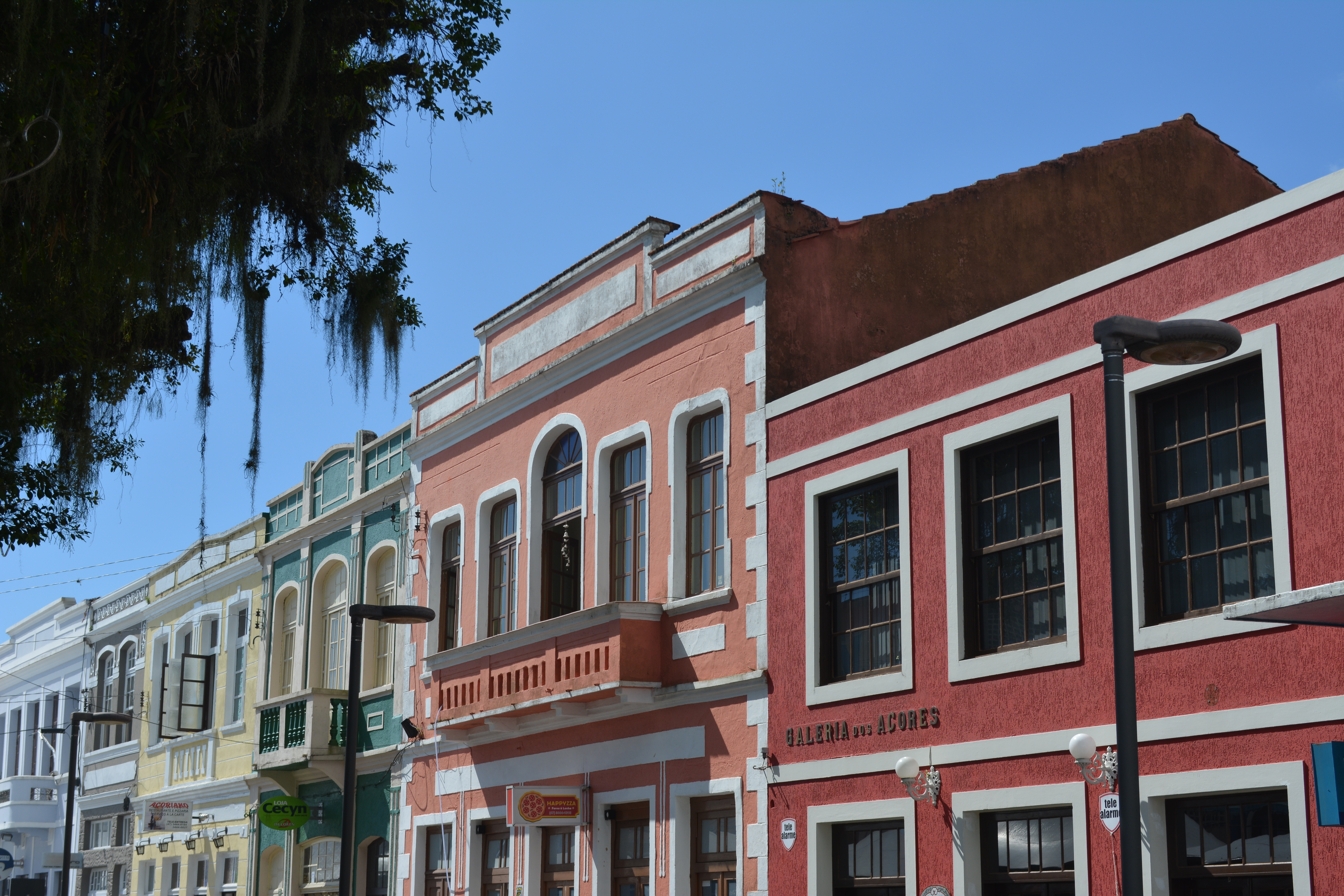
- Historic center of São Francisco do Sul

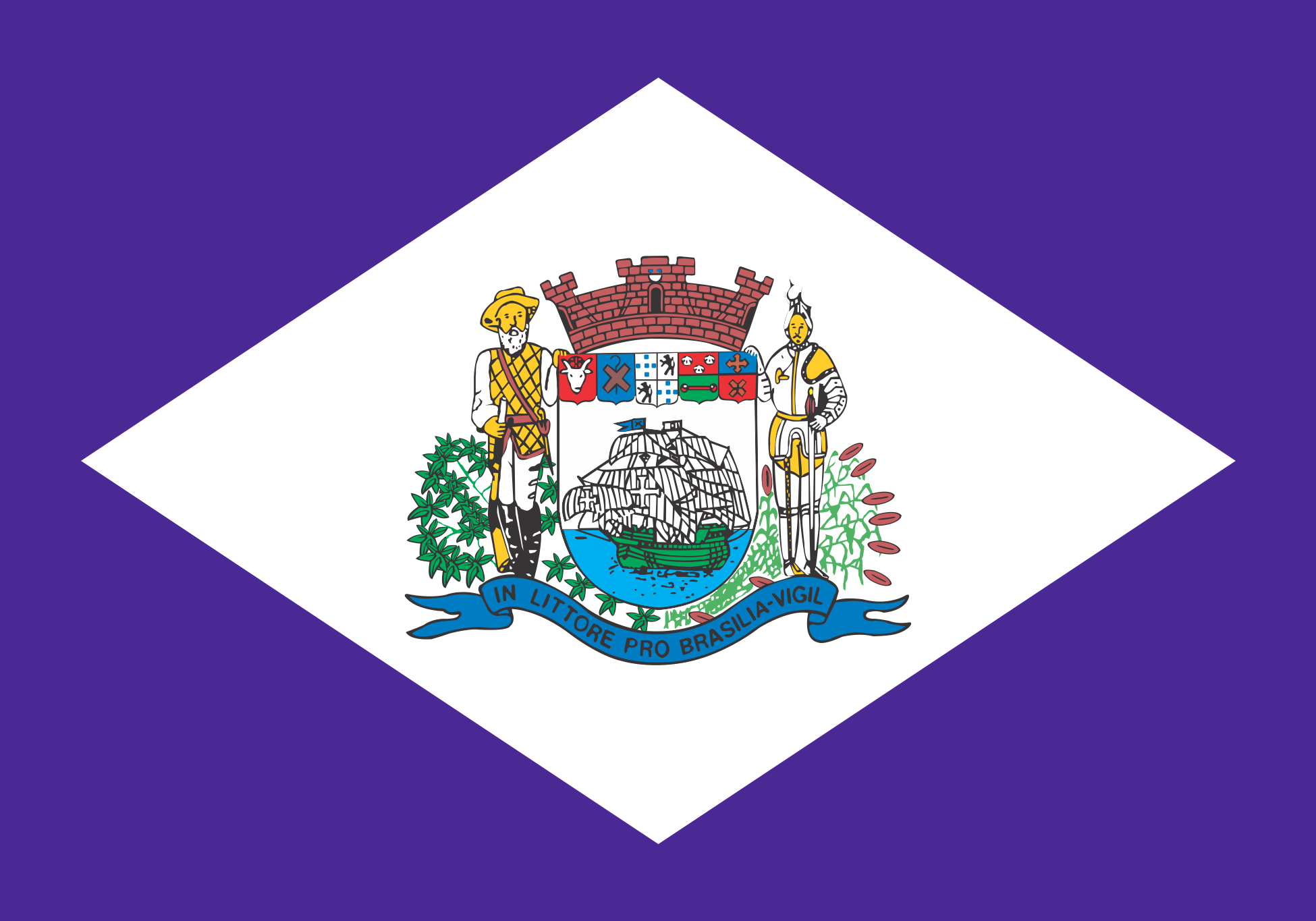
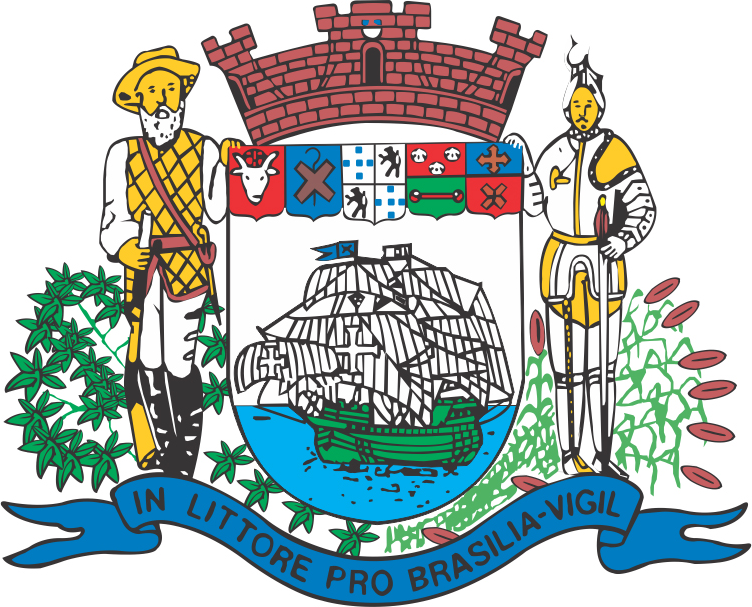
- Flag Coat of arms

- Location in Santa Catarina state

- Location in Brazil
- Coordinates: 26°14′34″S 48°38′16″W
- Country: Brazil
- Region: South
- State: Santa Catarina
- Mesoregion: Norte Catarinense
- Microregion: Joinville
- Founded: 1658

Area
  - Total: 540 km^{2} (210 sq mi)

Population (2020)
  - Total: 53,746
  - Density: 100/km^{2} (260/sq mi)
- Time zone: UTC−3 (BRT)
- HDI (2010): 0.762 – high
- Website: saofranciscodosul.sc.gov.br

São Francisco do Sul (literally "South St. Francis") is a municipality in the Brazilian state of Santa Catarina. It covers an area of 540 km^{2} (208 miles^{2}) and had an estimated population of 53,746 in 2020.

== Location ==
It was founded as a village by the Portuguese in 1658. Despite the date of its foundation, there's a previous record that a famous navigator left Honfleur, Normandy in France by the year of 1503 and arrived at São Francisco do Sul, at the Bay of Babitonga, Jean Binot Paulmier De Gonneville is also recognised by many historians as one of the first, if not the first, Europeans to arrive. It is situated on the northern end of the Island of São Francisco at the entrance to the Babitonga Bay.

São Francisco do Sul is an important part of the Brazilian infrastructure. It provides large bulk shipping facilities and is served by the major container shipping lines connecting with the South American east and west coasts, Africa, Asia, North and Central America, the Caribbean and Europe.

During the past decade, São Francisco do Sul has become a popular tourism destination for South American and international guests. The municipality contains the 6,667-hectare (16,470-acre) Acaraí State Park, created in 2005.

== Climate ==
Climate data for São Francisco do Sul (1976–2005)
Month	Jan	Feb	Mar	Apr	May	Jun	Jul	Aug	Sep	Oct	Nov	Dec	Year
Record high °C (°F)	38.5 (101.3)	40.3 (104.5)	34.8 (94.6)	33.7 (92.7)	32.3 (90.1)	30.8 (87.4)	33.8 (92.8)	33.9 (93.0)	31.7 (89.1)	32.6 (90.7)	35.4 (95.7)	38.4 (101.1)	40.3 (104.5)
Mean daily maximum °C (°F)	28.6 (83.5)	28.6 (83.5)	27.9 (82.2)	25.9 (78.6)	23.9 (75.0)	21.8 (71.2)	20.9 (69.6)	21.3 (70.3)	21.8 (71.2)	23.2 (73.8)	25.1 (77.2)	27.1 (80.8)	24.7 (76.4)
Daily mean °C (°F)	24.4 (75.9)	24.4 (75.9)	23.7 (74.7)	21.5 (70.7)	19.4 (66.9)	17.5 (63.5)	16.5 (61.7)	17.2 (63.0)	18.0 (64.4)	19.5 (67.1)	21.2 (70.2)	23.0 (73.4)	20.5 (69.0)
Mean daily minimum °C (°F)	21.5 (70.7)	21.9 (71.4)	21.0 (69.8)	18.8 (65.8)	16.7 (62.1)	14.6 (58.3)	13.8 (56.8)	14.6 (58.3)	15.5 (59.9)	17.1 (62.8)	18.6 (65.5)	20.2 (68.4)	17.9 (64.1)
Record low °C (°F)	15.7 (60.3)	14.0 (57.2)	13.6 (56.5)	10.5 (50.9)	7.4 (45.3)	4.3 (39.7)	4.5 (40.1)	5.2 (41.4)	6.0 (42.8)	2.6 (36.7)	11.0 (51.8)	15.0 (59.0)	2.6 (36.7)
Average precipitation mm (inches)	205.0 (8.07)	180.0 (7.09)	158.0 (6.22)	102.0 (4.02)	100.0 (3.94)	100.0 (3.94)	84.0 (3.31)	80.0 (3.15)	119.0 (4.69)	119.0 (4.69)	117.0 (4.61)	128.0 (5.04)	1,492 (58.77)
Average relative humidity (%)	86	88	88	86	88	88	88	89	89	87	86	85	87
Mean monthly sunshine hours	171	146	153	152	158	133	144	124	103	111	141	169	1,705
Source 1: Empresa Brasileira de Pesquisa Agropecuária (EMBRAPA)
Source 2: Climatempo (precipitation)

== International relations ==
=== Twin towns – Sister cities ===
São Francisco do Sul is twinned with:

- Honfleur, Calvados, France
