= Port of Santos =

Container port in the city of Santos, São Paulo, Brazil

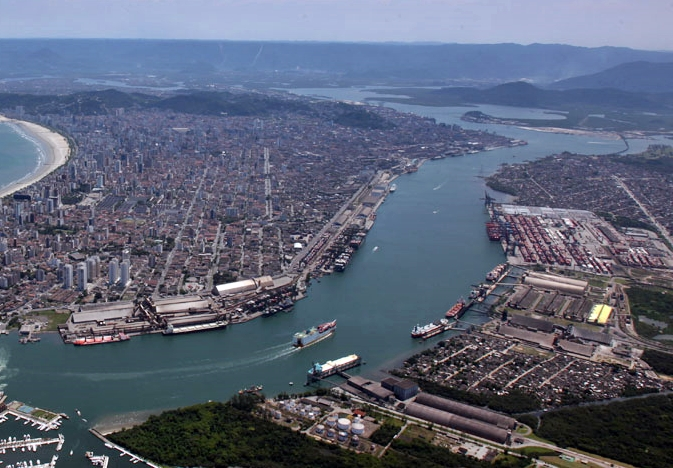
- Aerial view of Port of Santos
- Interactive map of Port of Santos

Location
- Country: Brazil
- Location: Santos, São Paulo
- Coordinates: 23°58′56.02″S 46°17′33.38″W

Details
- Opened: 2 February 1892; 134 years ago
- Operated by: Santos Port Authority
- Owned by: Federal government of Brazil
- Type of harbour: Maritime
- Size: 7.8 km² (3.01 sq mi)
- Employees: 1,468

Statistics
- Annual cargo tonnage: 147,0 million tonnes (2021)
- Annual container volume: 2.697 million TEUs
- Passenger traffic: 1.1 million (2010-2011)
- Net income: R$ 199.3 million (2012)
- Website; Official website

The Port of Santos (in Portuguese: Porto de Santos) is in the city of Santos, state of São Paulo, Brazil. As of 2024, it was the second busiest container port in Latin America. In 2022, it was considered the 40th largest port in the world for container handling, and the 35th per ton, according to the AAPA - American Association of Port Authorities ranking, being the busiest in Latin America.

It possesses a wide variety of cargo handling terminals—solid and liquid bulk, containers, and general loads. It is Brazil's leading port in container traffic. The terrestrial access system to the port is made up by the Anchieta and Imigrantes highways and by the railroads operated by Ferroban and MRS.

It was once considered the "port of death" in the 19th century due to yellow fever, and ships often avoided docking at the wood plank port. The floods in the city's area provoked illnesses.

Today it is Latin America's largest port. Its structure is considered Brazil's most modern.

In the early 20th century, major overhauling and urbanization created the port's modern structure seen today, eliminating the risk of diseases and providing the port with modern, industrial-age infrastructure.

The location of the city of Santos was chosen at a convenient point for crossing the Serra do Mar mountain range, which is the main obstacle to access the interior. The first railway link from the port to the state capital São Paulo City, 79 km away, and the state's interior, was completed in 1864. This allowed for an easier transportation of the vast masses of migrant workers who headed to São Paulo and the state's numerous coffee farms. The main product exported by Santos until World War II was São Paulo state's huge coffee production, Brazil's largest. Today, coffee has become a smaller component of Brazil's exports. Cars, machinery, orange juice, soybeans are now some of the port's main exports.

Millions of immigrants reached Brazil via the Port of Santos in the late 19th and early 20th centuries, proceeding to the country's interior by railway.

== History ==
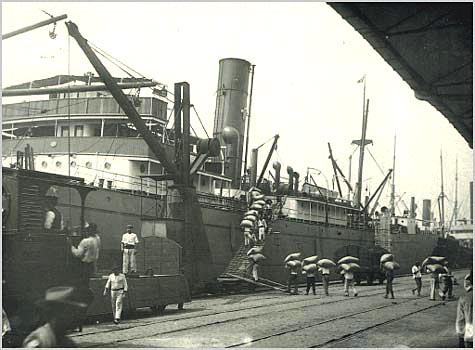
Coffee transportation at the port in 1895

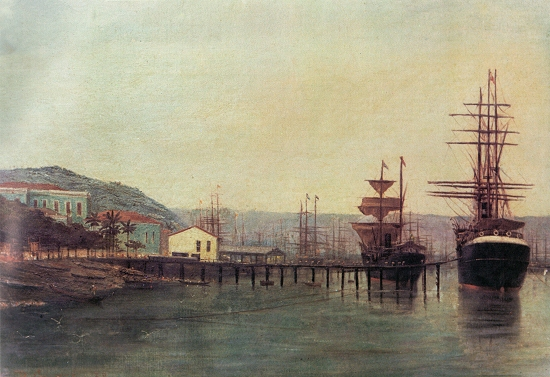
The port in 1889, as painted by Benedito Calixto.

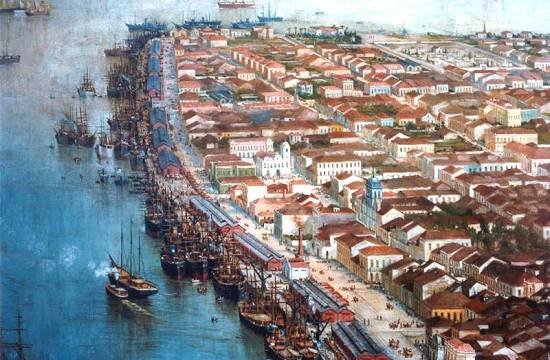
The Port of Santos in the 1900s

The port of Santos was originally founded on Tuesday, 2 February 1892. In 1913, there were about 90,000 inhabitants in the city of Santos and the economically active population was at about 37,000 with 22.7 percent working in the port as longshoremen, stevedores, carters, porters and coffee sackers. During the time after World War II, up to 1960, the port was known as the “Red Port” because of strong influence of communism in the workers unions and city's politics. Lack of investments and high tariffs were factors observed at the time and led the Port of Santos to a rapid decay around 1970. In 1980, the 90-year concession period ceded to Companhia Docas de Santos or CODESP. CODESP was a big player in the ports structure and worker culture. CODESP was in control of most of the port operations, created a new culture of work that created stronger bonds between the workers, and allowed for the creation of institutions to unite different categories of workers. Ever since the late 19th century the CODESP has tried to gain even more control over port operations. This, however, violated the workers’ sense of freedom and independence and caused the uprising of many of the worker institutions through different strikes for worker rights. In 1993, the Brazilian government realized that the singular control over the port that CODESP had was inhibiting the ports ability to be competitive and be more efficient. They then passed a law that de-monopolized the port's operational services.

== Worker culture ==
The port is the principal source of jobs for the city of Santos. The fact that the town is mainly dependent on the one industry of the port, a strike in the port would cause considerable losses that could affect the entire city of Santos. Whenever the workers stopped working, the movement of goods would stop flowing, halting businesses, the flow of money, and all internal trade. This meant that when a strike would happen, the whole city joined the side of the workers because the city's population knew that the only way to return to the way of life was to end the strike. In 2016 the port declared that it had insufficient funds to pay for extra benefits and raises causing slowdowns. The workers were constantly unsatisfied and therefore demanded a 10% raise and were complaining about their new shift patterns. The strike halted all activities in the port terminals except for the release of dangerous cargoes, drugs, perishables, live cargo, funeral urns, and shipboard supplies.

The Santos port and the port workers were not separated from the rest of the city. The financial and commercial center of the city was close to the docks, which made for a more heterogeneous society in those areas. The life of port workers was far from insular and was shaped by a strong urban culture, as working class politics invaded spaces previously closed to workers' political expression. In Santos, the neighborhoods of the workers weren't separated by different occupation, as others were at the time. They also all had offices together which expedited the process of creating unified movements.

== Economy ==
Shaped by urban, economic and demographic development from the maritime industry, the Port of Santos is the largest port in Latin America, and the gateway to most of the goods that circulate Brazil. It drives the economy of the town of Santos and therefore the town is mainly dependent on the port. The people that live in Santos are influenced by the port's day to day actions. The port of Santos is Brazil's largest port providing exports and imports to and from all over the world. The main exports are coffee, sugar, and soy. The port handles 28% of Brazil's total cargo and in 2010, the Port of Santos handled a record of almost 97.2 million tons of cargo.

== Future plans ==
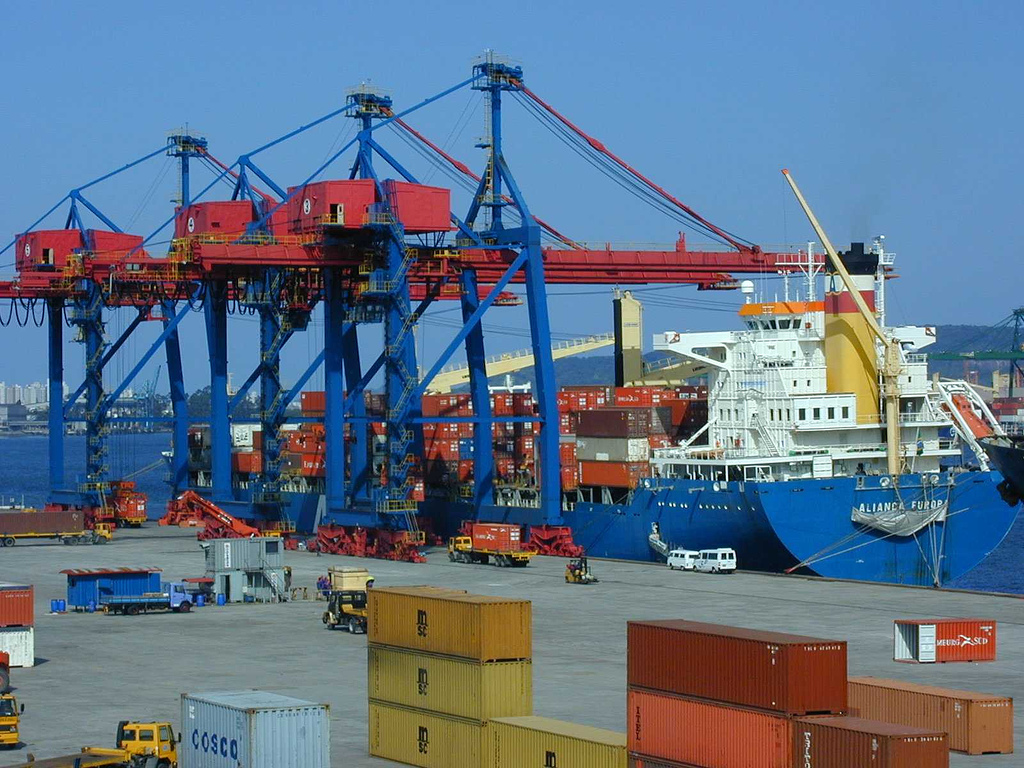
Tecon Santos, of Santos Brasil- the largest container terminal in South America.

Two issues facing the port today are access and distribution within the port. Due to the fact that the port operates 24 hours a day there is a lot of congestion on the roads and railways. There is only a three-lane road with two of those lanes for entry to the port and one for exiting. The port is considering a few possible solutions such as deepening the channels, applying intelligent transportation systems technologies, and better truck storage facilities. These plans for expansion have been planned to be put in place by the year 2024 due to the economic growth of the town. According to CODESP, all of these projects the Port of Santos will be moving three times more cargo, from the current 97.2 million tons to 230 million tons, with the general cargo accounting for 53% of this volume, solid bulk for 30% and liquid bulk for 17%. The ports difficulties of flow in the port areas can be categorized into four different areas: the difficulties of flow in the port areas, the constraints to the rail model, the poor utilization of the capacity of the maritime terminals and the congestion in accesses.

== See also ==
- Santos Brasil
- List of deepest natural harbours
