= Mesoregion of São José do Rio Preto =

- Mesoregion
- Location of the Mesoregion of São José do Rio Preto
- Coordinates: 20°48′29″S 49°22′52″W
- Country: Brazil
- Region: Southeast
- State: São Paulo

Area
  - Total: 29,394.7 km^{2} (11,349.4 sq mi)

Population (2010/IBGE)
  - Total: 1,569,220
  - Density: 53.38/km^{2} (138.3/sq mi)
- Time zone: UTC-3 (UTC-3)
  - Summer (DST): UTC-2 (UTC-2)
- Area code: +55 17

The Mesoregion of São José do Rio Preto is one of the 15 mesoregions of the São Paulo state, Brazil. It is located at the north/northwest portion of the state, and has an area of 29,394.7 km².

The mesoregion has a population of 1,569,220 inhabitants (IBGE/2010), spread over 109 municipalities.

== Municipalities ==
All data from IBGE/2010

=== Microregion of Auriflama ===
- Population: 46,367
- Area (km²): 2,312.2
- Population density (km²): 20.05

Auriflama, Floreal, Gastão Vidigal, General Salgado, Guzolândia, Magda, Nova Castilho, Nova Luzitânia, São João de Iracema

=== Microregion of Catanduva ===
- Population: 221,465
- Area (km²): 2,283.6
- Population density (km²): 96.98

Ariranha, Cajobi, Catanduva, Catiguá, Elisiário, Embaúba, Novais, Palmares Paulista, Paraíso, Pindorama, Santa Adélia, Severínia, Tabapuã

=== Microregion of Fernandópolis ===
- Population: 104,623
- Area (km²): 2,811.7
- Population density (km²): 37.21

Estrela d'Oeste, Fernandópolis, Guarani d'Oeste, Indiaporã, Macedônia, Meridiano, Mira Estrela, Ouroeste, Pedranópolis, São João das Duas Pontes, Turmalina

=== Microregion of Jales ===
- Population: 149,197
- Area (km²): 3,928.9
- Population density (km²): 37.97

Aparecida d'Oeste, Aspásia, Dirce Reis, Dolcinópolis, Jales, Marinópolis, Mesópolis, Nova Canaã Paulista, Palmeira d'Oeste, Paranapuã, Pontalinda, Populina, Rubinéia, Santa Albertina, Santa Clara d'Oeste, Santa Fé do Sul, Santa Rita d'Oeste, Santa Salete, Santana da Ponte Pensa, São Francisco, Três Fronteiras, Urânia, Vitória Brasil

=== Microregion of Nhandeara ===
- Population: 65,337
- Area (km²): 2,016.7
- Population density (km²): 32.40

Macaubal, Monções, Monte Aprazível, Neves Paulista, Nhandeara, Nipoã, Poloni, Sebastianópolis do Sul, União Paulista

=== Microregion of Novo Horizonte ===
- Population: 79,222
- Area (km²): 2,435.1
- Population density (km²): 32.53

Irapuã, Itajobi, Marapoama, Novo Horizonte, Sales, Urupês

=== Microregion of São José do Rio Preto ===
- Population: 763,534
- Area (km²): 10,397.8
- Population density (km²): 73.43

Adolfo, Altair, Bady Bassitt, Bálsamo, Cedral, Guapiaçu, Guaraci, Ibirá, Icém, Ipiguá, Jaci, José Bonifácio, Mendonça, Mirassol, Mirassolândia, Nova Aliança, Nova Granada, Olímpia, Onda Verde, Orindiúva, Palestina, Paulo de Faria, Planalto, Potirendaba, São José do Rio Preto, Tanabi, Ubarana, Uchoa, Zacarias

=== Microregion of Votuporanga ===
- Population: 139,475
- Area (km²): 3,208.7
- Population density (km²): 43.47

Álvares Florence, Américo de Campos, Cardoso, Cosmorama, Parisi, Pontes Gestal, Riolândia, Valentim Gentil, Votuporanga
