= Microregion of Jales =

- Microregion
- Location of the Microregion of Jales
- Coordinates: 20°16′08″S 50°32′45″W
- Country: Brazil
- Region: Southeast
- State: São Paulo
- Mesoregion: São José do Rio Preto

Area
  - Total: 3,928.9 km^{2} (1,517.0 sq mi)

Population (2010/IBGE)
  - Total: 149,197
  - Density: 37.974/km^{2} (98.353/sq mi)
- Time zone: UTC-3 (UTC-3)
  - Summer (DST): UTC-2 (UTC-2)
- Postal Code: 15700-000
- Area code: +55 17

The Microregion of Jales (Portuguese: Microrregião de Jales) is located on the northwest of São Paulo state, Brazil, and is made up of 23 municipalities. It belongs to the Mesoregion of São José do Rio Preto.

The microregion has a population of 149,197 inhabitants, in an area of 3,928.9 km^{2}

== Municipalities ==
The microregion consists of the following municipalities, listed below with their 2010 Census populations (IBGE/2010):

- Aparecida d'Oeste: 4,450
- Aspásia: 1,809
- Dirce Reis: 1,689
- Dolcinópolis: 2,096
- Jales: 47,012
- Marinópolis: 2,113
- Mesópolis: 1,886
- Nova Canaã Paulista: 2,114
- Palmeira d'Oeste: 9,584
- Paranapuã: 3,815
- Pontalinda: 4,074
- Populina: 4,223
- Rubinéia: 2,862
- Santa Albertina: 5,723
- Santa Clara d'Oeste: 2,084
- Santa Fé do Sul: 29,239
- Santa Rita d'Oeste: 2,543
- Santa Salete: 1,447
- Santana da Ponte Pensa: 1,641
- São Francisco: 2,793
- Três Fronteiras: 5,427
- Urânia: 8,836
- Vitória Brasil: 1,737

== See also ==
- Interior of São Paulo
