= Subdivisions of São Paulo (state) =

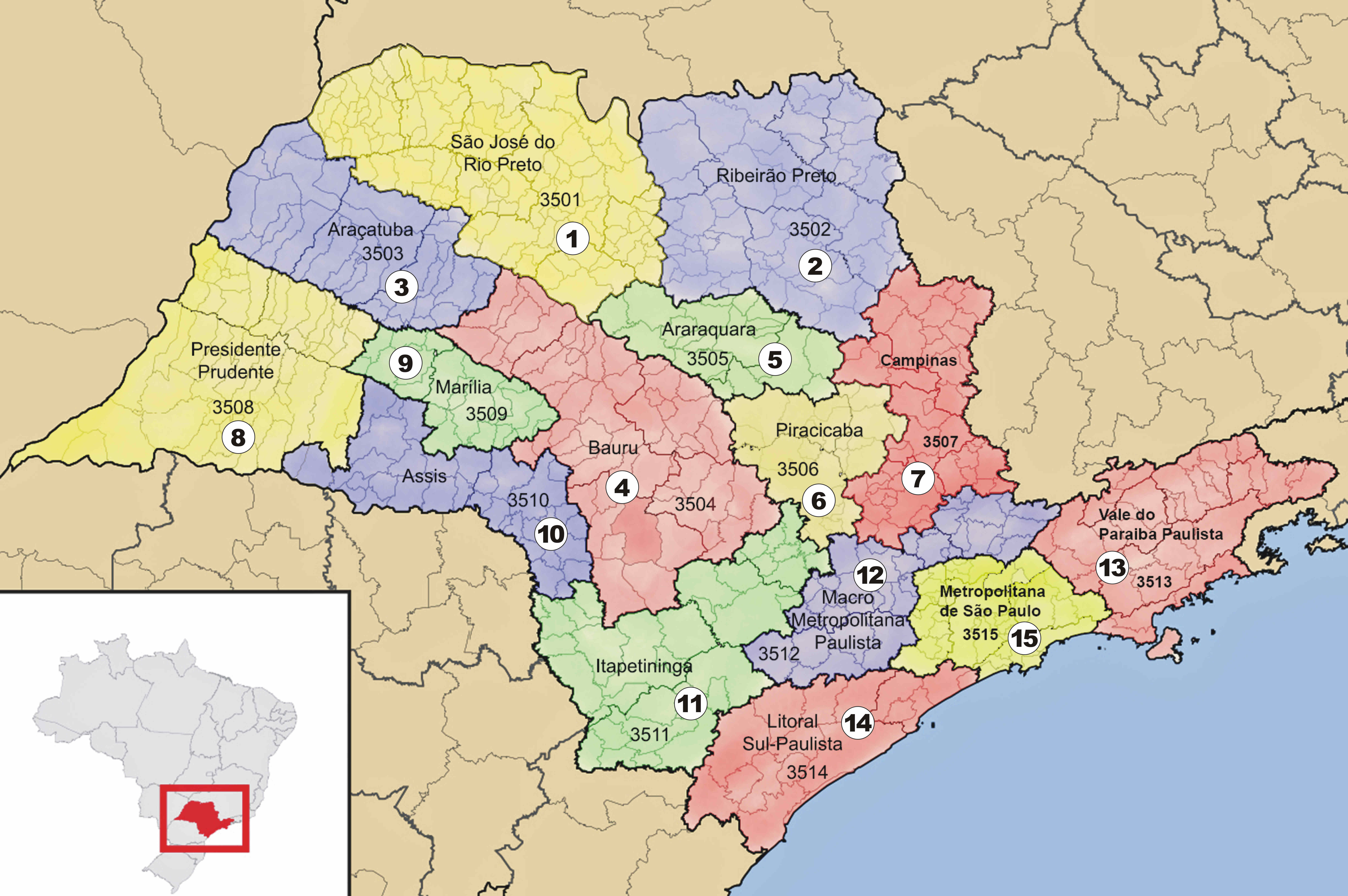
Map of São Paulo showing its subdivisions: mesoregions, microregions and municipalities

The state of São Paulo, Brazil, is administratively divided into 15 mesoregions which are further divided into 64 microregions. They are further divided into 645 municipalities.

== Mesoregions ==
- Araçatuba
- Araraquara
- Assis
- Bauru
- Campinas
- Itapetininga
- Litoral Sul Paulista
- Macro Metropolitan Paulista
- Marília
- Metropolitan São Paulo
- Piracicaba
- Presidente Prudente
- Ribeirão Preto
- São José do Rio Preto
- Vale do Paraíba Paulista

== Microregions ==
- Adamantina
- Amparo
- Andradina
- Araçatuba
- Araraquara
- Assis
- Auriflama
- Avaré
- Bananal
- Barretos
- Batatais
- Bauru
- Birigui
- Botucatu
- Bragança Paulista
- Campinas
- Capão Bonito
- Campos do Jordão
- Caraguatatuba
- Catanduva
- Dracena
- Fernandópolis
- Franca
- Franco da Rocha
- Guaratinguetá
- Guarulhos
- Itanhaém
- Itapecerica da Serra
- Itapetininga
- Itapeva
- Ituverava
- Jaboticabal
- Jales
- Jaú
- Jundiaí
- Limeira
- Lins
- Marília
- Mogi das Cruzes
- Mogi-Mirim
- Nhandeara
- Novo Horizonte
- Osasco
- Ourinhos
- Paraibuna e Paraitinga
- Paulínia
- Piedade
- Piracicaba
- Pirassununga
- Presidente Prudente
- Registro
- Ribeirão Preto
- Rio Claro
- Santos
- São Carlos
- São João da Boa Vista
- São Joaquim da Barra
- São José dos Campos
- São José do Rio Preto
- São Paulo
- Sorocaba
- Tatuí
- Tupã
- Votuporanga
