= Microregion of Catanduva =

- Microregion
- Location of the Microregion of Catanduva
- Coordinates: 21°08′16″S 48°58′22″W
- Country: Brazil
- Region: Southeast
- State: São Paulo
- Mesoregion: São José do Rio Preto

Area
  - Total: 2,283.6 km^{2} (881.7 sq mi)

Population (2010/IBGE)
  - Total: 221,465
  - Density: 96.98/km^{2} (251.2/sq mi)
- Time zone: UTC-3 (UTC-3)
  - Summer (DST): UTC-2 (UTC-2)
- Postal Code: 15800-000
- Area code: +55 17

The Microregion of Catanduva (Portuguese: Microrregião de Catanduva) is located on the north of São Paulo state, Brazil, and is made up of 13 municipalities. It belongs to the Mesoregion of São José do Rio Preto.

The microregion has a population of 221,465 inhabitants, in an area of 2,283.6 km²

== Municipalities ==
The microregion consists of the following municipalities, listed below with their 2010 Census populations (IBGE/2010):

- Ariranha: 8,547
- Cajobi: 9,768
- Catanduva: 112,820
- Catiguá: 7,127
- Elisiário: 3,120
- Embaúba: 2,423
- Novais: 4,592
- Palmares Paulista: 10,934
- Paraíso: 5,898
- Pindorama: 15,039
- Santa Adélia: 14,333
- Severínia: 15,501
- Tabapuã: 11,363
