= List of mesoregions of São Paulo (state) =

List of mesoregions of the State of São Paulo, Brazil, with their component microregions.

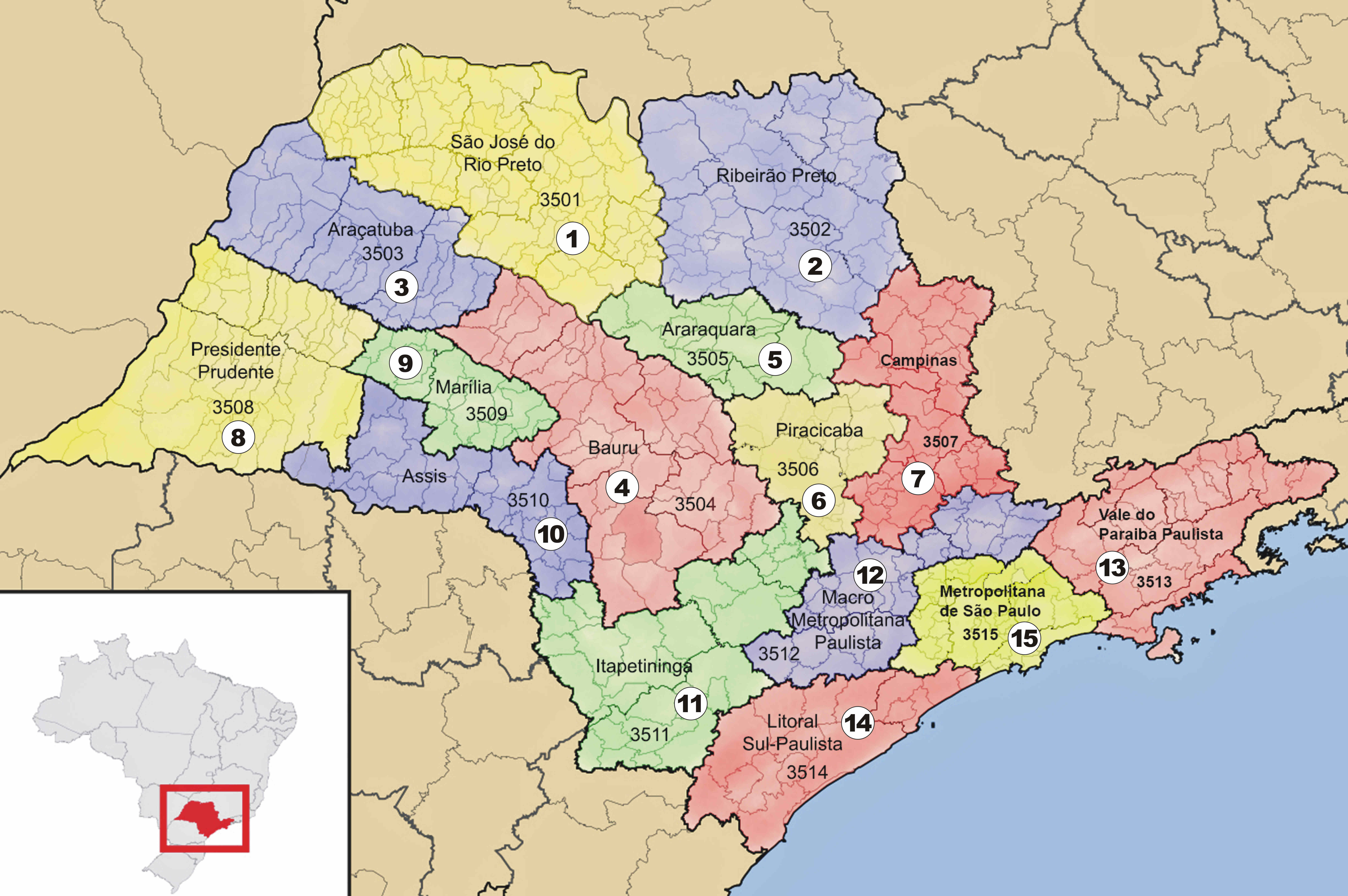

== São José do Rio Preto ==

- Microregion of Auriflama
- Microregion of Catanduva
- Microregion of Fernandópolis
- Microregion of Jales
- Microregion of Nhandeara
- Microregion of Novo Horizonte
- Microregion of São José do Rio Preto
- Microregion of Votuporanga

== Ribeirão Preto ==

- Microregion of Barretos
- Microregion of Batatais
- Microregion of Franca
- Microregion of Jaboticabal
- Microregion of Ribeirão Preto
- Microregion of São Joaquim da Barra

== Araçatuba ==

- Microregion of Andradina
- Microregion of Araçatuba
- Microregion of Birigüi

== Bauru ==

- Microregion of Avaré
- Microregion of Bauru
- Microregion of Botucatu
- Microregion of Jaú
- Microregion of Lins

== Araraquara ==

- Microregion of Araraquara
- Microregion of São Carlos

== Piracicaba ==

- Microregion of Limeira
- Microregion of Piracicaba
- Microregion of Rio Claro

== Campinas ==

- Microregion of Amparo
- Microregion of Campinas
- Microregion of Mogi-Mirim
- Microregion of Pirassununga
- Microregion of São João da Boa Vista

== Presidente Prudente ==

- Microregion of Adamantina
- Microregion of Dracena
- Microregion of Presidente Prudente

== Marília ==

- Microregion of Marília
- Microregion of Tupã

== Assis ==

- Microregion of Assis
- Microregion of Ourinhos

== Itapetininga ==

- Microregion of Capão Bonito
- Microregion of Itapetininga
- Microregion of Itapeva
- Microregion of Tatuí

== Macro Metropolitana Paulista ==

- Microregion of Bragança Paulista
- Microregion of Jundiaí
- Microregion of Piedade
- Microregion of Sorocaba

== Vale do Paraíba Paulista ==

- Microregion of Bananal
- Microregion of Campos do Jordão
- Microregion of Caraguatatuba
- Microregion of Guaratinguetá
- Microregion of Paraibuna/Paraitinga
- Microregion of São José dos Campos

== Litoral Sul Paulista ==

- Microregion of Itanhaém
- Microregion of Registro

== Metropolitan São Paulo ==

- Microregion of Franco da Rocha
- Microregion of Guarulhos
- Microregion of Itapecerica da Serra
- Microregion of Mogi das Cruzes
- Microregion of Osasco
- Microregion of Santos
- Microregion of São Paulo
