= Santa Albertina =

- Municipality
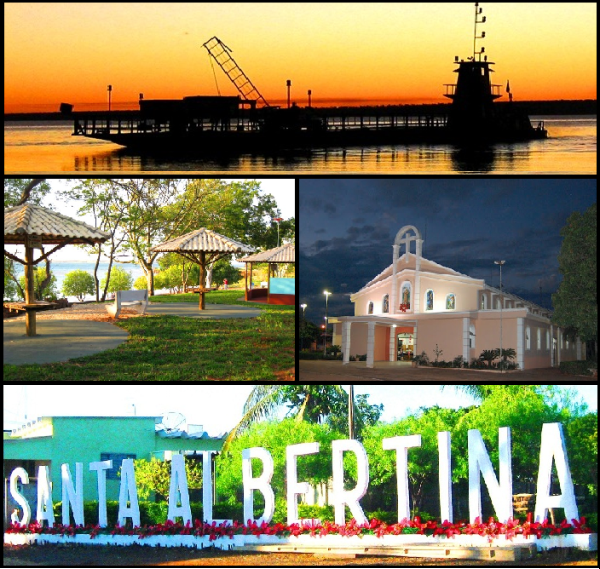

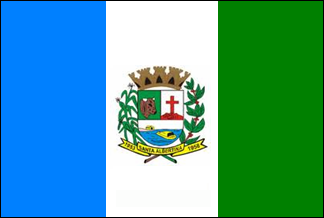
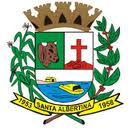
- Flag Coat of arms

- Location in São Paulo state

- Location in Brazil
- Coordinates: 20°1′55″S 50°43′40″W
- Country: Brazil
- Region: Southeast
- State: São Paulo
- Mesoregion: São José do Rio Preto
- Microregion: Jales

Area
  - Total: 272 km^{2} (105 sq mi)
- Elevation: 420 m (1,380 ft)

Population (2020)
  - Total: 6,022
  - Density: 22.1/km^{2} (57.3/sq mi)
- Time zone: UTC−3 (BRT)
- Website: www.santaalbertina.sp.gov.br

Santa Albertina is a municipality in the state of São Paulo in Brazil. The population is 6,022 (2020 est.) in an area of 272 km^{2} (105 sq mi). The elevation is 420 m. It is situated on the border with the state of Minas Gerais, on the left bank of the Rio Grande.

== Media ==
In telecommunications, the city was served by Telecomunicações de São Paulo. In July 1998, this company was acquired by Telefónica, which adopted the Vivo brand in 2012. The company is currently an operator of cell phones, fixed lines, internet (fiber optics/4G) and television (satellite and cable).

== Geography ==
=== Neighbouring Municipalities ===
- Urânia
- Paranapuã
- Mesópolis
- Aspásia
- Santa Rita d'Oeste
- Carneirinho (Minas Gerais)

=== Distances ===
- Brasília (Capital City Of Brazil) : 754 km
- São Paulo (Capital City Of The State Of São Paulo) : 621 km
- São José do Rio Preto : 179 km
- Araçatuba : 150 km
- Jales : 32 km

== See also ==
- List of municipalities in São Paulo
- Interior of São Paulo
