= Microregion of Votuporanga =

- Microregion
- Location of the Microregion of Votuporanga
- Coordinates: 20°25′02″S 49°58′22″W
- Country: Brazil
- Region: Southeast
- State: São Paulo
- Mesoregion: São José do Rio Preto

Area
  - Total: 3,208.7 km^{2} (1,238.9 sq mi)

Population (2010/IBGE)
  - Total: 166,057
  - Density: 51.752/km^{2} (134.04/sq mi)
- Time zone: UTC-3 (UTC-3)
  - Summer (DST): UTC-2 (UTC-2)
- Postal Code: 15500-000
- Area code: +55 17

The Microregion of Votuporanga (Portuguese: Microrregião de Votuporanga) is located on the northwest of São Paulo state, Brazil, and is made up of 9 municipalities. It belongs to the Mesoregion of São José do Rio Preto.

The microregion has a population of 139,475 inhabitants, in an area of 3,208.7 km²

== Municipalities ==
The microregion consists of the following municipalities, listed below with their 2010 Census populations (IBGE/2010):

- Álvares Florence: 3,897
- Américo de Campos: 5,706
- Cardoso: 12,805
- Cosmorama: 7,214
- Parisi: 2,132
- Pontes Gestal: 3,518
- Riolândia: 12,575
- Valentim Gentil: 17,036
- Votuporanga:104,692

== See also ==
- Interior of São Paulo
