= List of microregions of São Paulo (state) =

The state of São Paulo is divided into 63 microregions, grouped into 15 mesoregions:

== List ==
1. Adamantina
2. Amparo
3. Andradina
4. Araçatuba
5. Araraquara
6. Assis
7. Auriflama
8. Avaré
9. Bananal
10. Barretos
11. Batatais
12. Bauru
13. Birigüi
14. Botucatu
15. Bragança Paulista
16. Campinas
17. Campos do Jordão
18. Capão Bonito
19. Caraguatatuba
20. Catanduva
21. Dracena
22. Fernandópolis
23. Franca
24. Franco da Rocha
25. Guaratinguetá
26. Guarulhos
27. Itanhaém
28. Itapecerica da Serra
29. Itapetininga
30. Itapeva
31. Ituverava
32. Jaboticabal
33. Jales
34. Jaú
35. Jundiaí
36. Limeira
37. Lins
38. Marília
39. Mogi das Cruzes
40. Moji Mirim
41. Nhandeara
42. Novo Horizonte
43. Osasco
44. Ourinhos
45. Paraibuna/Paraitinga
46. Piedade
47. Piracicaba
48. Pirassununga
49. Presidente Prudente
50. Registro
51. Ribeirão Preto
52. Rio Claro
53. Santos
54. São Carlos
55. São João da Boa Vista
56. São Joaquim da Barra
57. São José dos Campos
58. São José do Rio Preto
59. São Paulo
60. Sorocaba
61. Tatuí
62. Tupã
63. Votuporanga
