= Microregion of Novo Horizonte =

- Microregion
- Location of the Microregion of Novo Horizonte
- Coordinates: 21°28′04″S 49°13′15″W
- Country: Brazil
- Region: Southeast
- State: São Paulo
- Mesoregion: São José do Rio Preto

Area
  - Total: 2,435.1 km^{2} (940.2 sq mi)

Population (2010/IBGE)
  - Total: 79,222
  - Density: 32.533/km^{2} (84.261/sq mi)
- Time zone: UTC-3 (UTC-3)
  - Summer (DST): UTC-2 (UTC-2)
- Postal Code: 14960-000
- Area code: +55 17

The Microregion of Novo Horizonte (Portuguese: Microrregião de Novo Horizonte) is located on the north of São Paulo state, Brazil, and is made up of 6 municipalities. It belongs to the Mesoregion of São José do Rio Preto.

The microregion has a population of 79,222 inhabitants, in an area of 2,435.1 km²

== Municipalities ==
The microregion consists of the following municipalities, listed below with their 2010 Census populations (IBGE/2010):

- Irapuã: 7,275
- Itajobi: 14,556
- Marapoama: 2,633
- Novo Horizonte: 36,593
- Sales: 5,451
- Urupês: 12,714

== See also ==
- Interior of São Paulo
