= Ibirá =

- Municipality
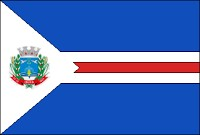
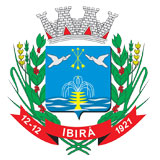
- Flag Coat of arms

- Location in São Paulo state

- Location in Brazil
- Coordinates: 21°04′49″S 49°14′21″W
- Country: Brazil
- Region: Southeast
- State: São Paulo
- Mesoregion: São José do Rio Preto

Government
  - Mayor: Nivaldo Domingos Negrão

Area
  - Total: 271.9 km^{2} (105.0 sq mi)
- Elevation: 446 m (1,463 ft)

Population (2020)
  - Total: 12,518
  - Density: 46.04/km^{2} (119.2/sq mi)
- Time zone: UTC−3 (BRT)
- Postal code: 15860-000
- Area code: +55 17
- Website: www.ibira.sp.gov.br

Ibirá is a municipality in the state of São Paulo, Brazil. The population is 12,518 (2020 est.) in an area of 190 km^{2} (73 sq mi). Ibirá is known as a tourist resort, due to the thermal waters.

== Neighboring municipalities ==
- Potirendaba
- Cedral
- Uchoa
- Catanduva
- Catiguá
- Elisiário
- Urupês

== Geography ==
The municipality of Ibirá is situated in the northern part of São Paulo state. Its main river is the Rio do Cubatão, a tributary of the Tietê River.

== Demographics ==
Historical population
Year	Pop.	±%
2001	9,447	—
2004	9,824	+4.0%
2010	10,896	+10.9%
2015	11,861	+8.9%

== Transportation ==
- SP-310 Highway Washington Luís
- SP-379 Rodovia Roberto Mario Perosa

== Media ==
In telecommunications, the city was served by Telecomunicações de São Paulo. In July 1998, this company was acquired by Telefónica, which adopted the Vivo brand in 2012. The company is currently an operator of cell phones, fixed lines, internet (fiber optics/4G) and television (satellite and cable).

== Notable people ==
- Evandro Guerra (1981 -), brazilian volleyball player, Olympic Champion

== See also ==
- List of municipalities in São Paulo
- Interior of São Paulo
