= Ariranha =

Municipality in the state of São Paulo in Brazil

- Municipality
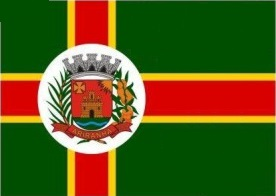
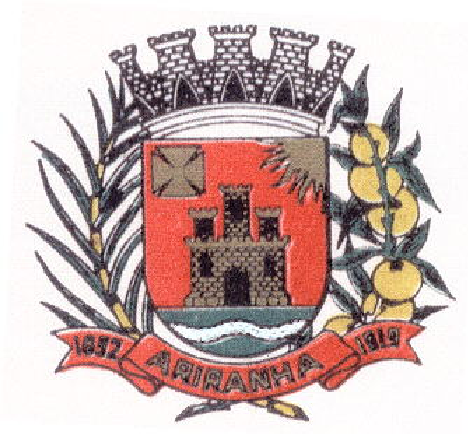
- Flag Coat of arms

- Location in São Paulo state

- Location in Brazil
- Coordinates: 21°11′16″S 48°47′13″W
- Country: Brazil
- Region: Southeast
- State: São Paulo
- Mesoregion: São José do Rio Preto
- Microregion: Catanduva

Area
  - Total: 132.6 km^{2} (51.2 sq mi)
- Elevation: 595 m (1,952 ft)

Population (2020)
  - Total: 9,761
  - Density: 73.61/km^{2} (190.7/sq mi)
- Time zone: UTC−3 (BRT)
- Postal code: 15960-000
- Area code: +55 17
- Website: www.ariranha.sp.gov.br

Ariranha is a municipality in the state of São Paulo, Brazil. The population is 9,761 (2020 est.) in an area of 132.6 km^{2} (51.2 sq mi). Ariranha belongs to the Mesoregion of São José do Rio Preto.

== Demographics ==
Historical population (municipality)
Year	Population	%±
1920	11,083
1940	7,310	−34.0%
1950	8,027	9.8%
1960	8,868	10.5%
1970	5,094	−42.6%
1980	5,538	8.7%
1991	5,845	5.5%
2000	7,477	27.9%
2010	8,547	14.3%
2022	7,602	−11.1%

== Media ==
In telecommunications, the city was served by Telecomunicações de São Paulo. In July 1998, this company was acquired by Telefónica, which adopted the Vivo brand in 2012. The company is currently an operator of cell phones, fixed lines, internet (fiber optics/4G) and television (satellite and cable).

== See also ==
- List of municipalities in São Paulo
- Interior of São Paulo
