= Novo Horizonte, São Paulo =

Novo Horizonte
- Municipality
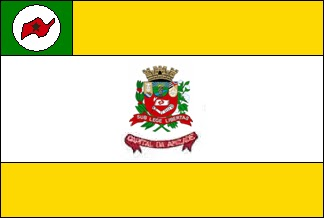
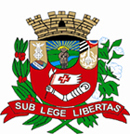
- Flag Coat of arms

- Location in São Paulo state

- Location in Brazil
- Coordinates: 21°20′08″S 49°13′15″W
- Country: Brazil
- Region: Southeast
- State: São Paulo
- Mesoregion: São José do Rio Preto
- Microregion: Novo Horizonte

Government
  - Mayor: Fabiano de Mello Belentani

Area
  - Total: 931.7 km^{2} (359.7 sq mi)

Population (2020)
  - Total: 41,414
  - Density: 44.45/km^{2} (115.1/sq mi)
- Time zone: UTC−3 (BRT)
- Postal code: 14960-000
- Area code: +55 17
- Website: www.novohorizonte.sp.gov.br

Novo Horizonte (Portuguese for "New Horizon") is a municipality in the state of São Paulo, Brazil. The population is 41,414 (2020 est.) in an area of 932 km^{2}. Novo Horizonte is the center of a Microregion with 79,222 inhabitants.

== History ==
In 1906, the district of Novo Horizonte was created. The city was officially established on December 21, 1916, and installed on October 28, 1917.

== Economy ==
The Tertiary sector is the economic basis of Novo Horizonte. Commerce, services and public administration corresponds to 69.9% of the city GDP. Industry is 21.5% of the GDP, and the Primary sector corresponds to 8.5%.

The cultivation and processing of sugarcane is relevant.

== Media ==
In telecommunications, the city was served by Telecomunicações de São Paulo. In July 1998, this company was acquired by Telefónica, which adopted the Vivo brand in 2012. The company is currently an operator of cell phones, fixed lines, internet (fiber optics/4G) and television (satellite and cable).

== Sport ==
Grêmio Novorizontino is the local association football club founded in 2010. It's the spiritual successor to Grêmio Esportivo Novorizontino which folded in 1999.

== See also ==
- List of municipalities in São Paulo
- Interior of São Paulo
