= Catanduva =

Municipality in São Paulo, Brazil

- Municipality
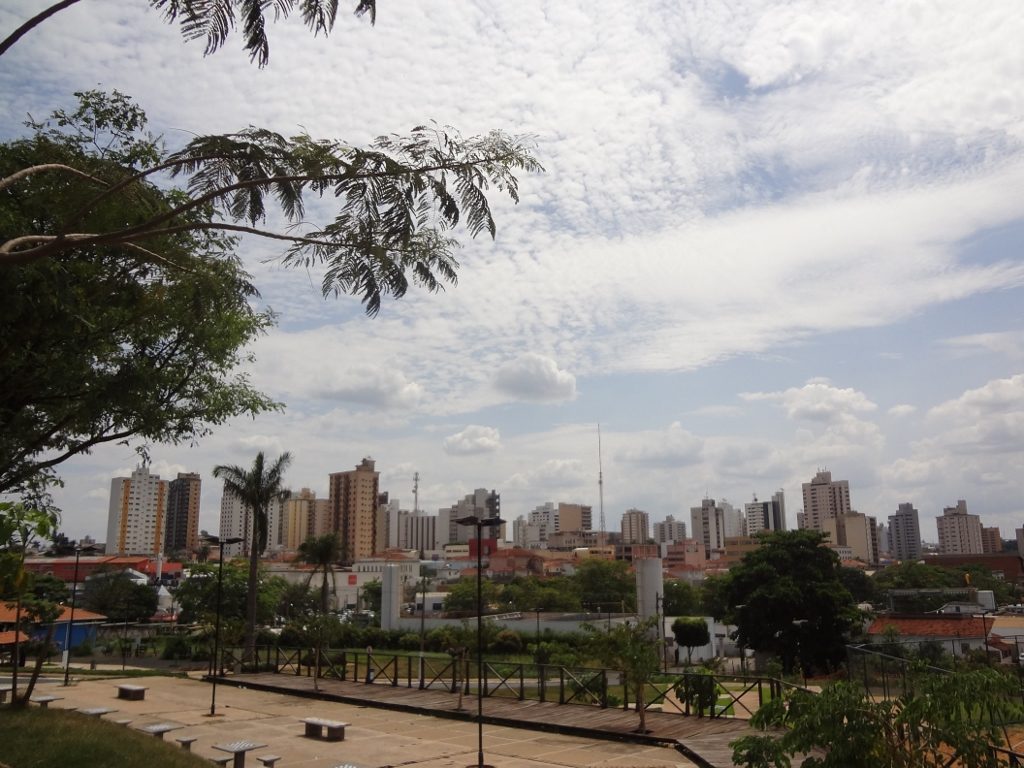

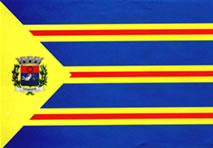
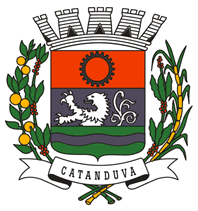
- Flag Coat of arms

- Location in São Paulo state

- Location in Brazil
- Coordinates: 21°08′16″S 48°58′22″W
- Country: Brazil
- Region: Southeast
- State: São Paulo
- Mesoregion: São José do Rio Preto
- Microregion: Catanduva

Government
  - Mayor: Osvaldo de Oliveira Rosa (PL)

Area
  - Total: 290.59 km^{2} (112.20 sq mi)
- Elevation: 503 m (1,650 ft)

Population (2022 Census)
  - Total: 115,785
  - Estimate (2025): 119,275
  - Density: 398.45/km^{2} (1,032.0/sq mi)
- Time zone: UTC-03:00 (BRT)
  - Summer (DST): UTC-02:00 (BRST)
- Postal code: 15800-000
- Area code: +55 17
- Website: www.catanduva.sp.gov.br

Catanduva is a municipality in the state of São Paulo, Brazil. The population is 115,785 (2022 Census) in an area of 290.59 km^{2}. Is the second largest city in the Northern part of the state, after São José do Rio Preto. The city has a diversified economy, and the cultivation and processing of sugarcane is relevant.

Catanduva is the center of the microregion of Catanduva with 221,465 inhabitants, in an area of 2,283.6 km^{2}.

== History ==
The history of Catanduva begins in the middle of the 19th century, in lands that belonged to Araraquara and, posteriorly, originated the cities of Monte Alto, Jaboticabal and São José do Rio Preto. In the beginning of the 20th century, Catanduva was known as Cerradinho, a small village.

On December 16, 1909, the village was elevated to district, with the name of Vila Adolpho, and on April 14, 1918, the municipality of Catanduva was established.

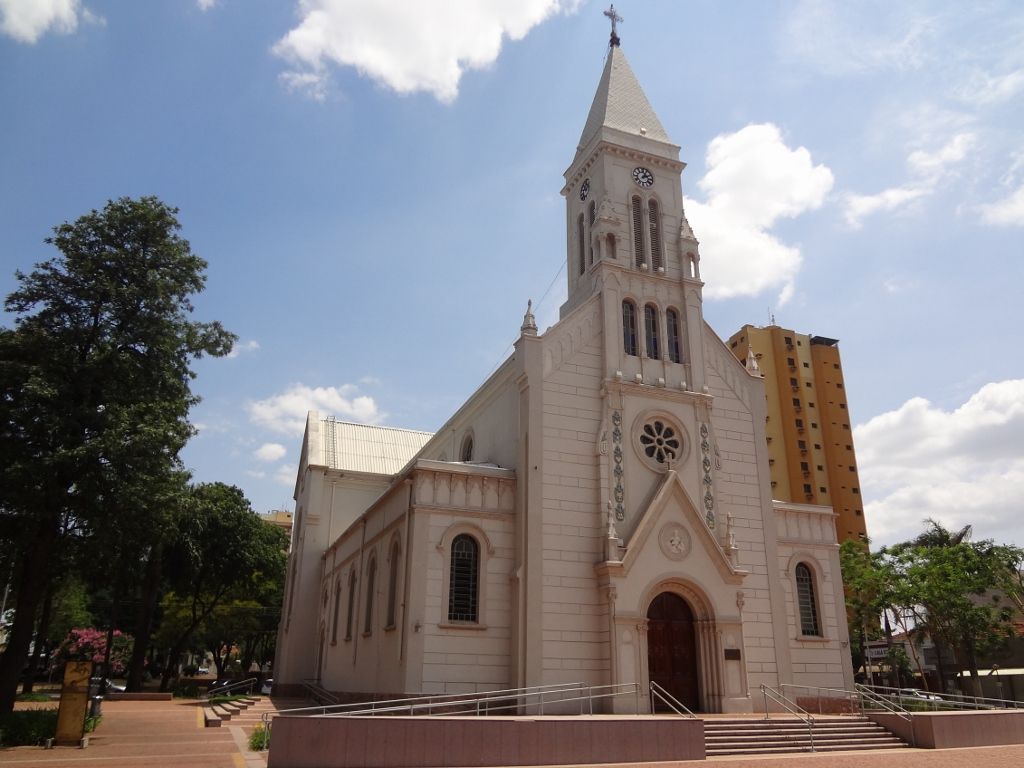
Mother Church of Catanduva.

The founders of Catanduva remain unknown, as there are two different histories. One of the versions tells that the small community of "Cerradinho", a little town built on the banks of the São Domingos river, was founded by the Figueiredo family, from Minas Gerais. The other famous version tells that the city was founded by Antônio Maximiano Rodrigues, also from Minas Gerais, who bought lands on the region, by the end of the 19th century. Later, part of these lands were donated to the São Domingos (Saint Dominic) parish. Saint Dominic is the patron saint of Catanduva.

== Name ==
Catanduva (Caa-tã-dyba in Tupi-guarani language) is a word of indigenous origin meaning "rough grass" or "unhealthy vegetation". It is a reference to the Brazilian Cerrado, the region's typical vegetation.

== Geography ==
=== Climate ===
The climate is Tropical sub-hot humid (3 dry months), with dry and mild winters and hot, wet summers. The average temperature of the coldest month is above 17 °C, and the average precipitation of the driest month is less than 60 mm. Its Köppen climate classification is Aw. The average annual temperature is 25.33 °C.

Climate data for Catanduva, elevation 570 m (1,870 ft), (1981–2010 normals)
Month	Jan	Feb	Mar	Apr	May	Jun	Jul	Aug	Sep	Oct	Nov	Dec	Year
Record high °C (°F)	38.6 (101.5)	39.8 (103.6)	36.8 (98.2)	35.2 (95.4)	35.1 (95.2)	33.4 (92.1)	35.1 (95.2)	39.3 (102.7)	41.2 (106.2)	42.5 (108.5)	39.3 (102.7)	38.3 (100.9)	42.5 (108.5)
Mean daily maximum °C (°F)	30.2 (86.4)	30.6 (87.1)	30.5 (86.9)	30.0 (86.0)	27.2 (81.0)	26.6 (79.9)	27.2 (81.0)	29.3 (84.7)	30.0 (86.0)	31.0 (87.8)	30.9 (87.6)	30.3 (86.5)	29.5 (85.1)
Daily mean °C (°F)	24.9 (76.8)	24.9 (76.8)	24.7 (76.5)	23.7 (74.7)	20.7 (69.3)	19.8 (67.6)	19.9 (67.8)	21.8 (71.2)	23.0 (73.4)	24.6 (76.3)	24.9 (76.8)	24.9 (76.8)	23.2 (73.8)
Mean daily minimum °C (°F)	20.9 (69.6)	20.7 (69.3)	20.4 (68.7)	18.8 (65.8)	15.9 (60.6)	14.8 (58.6)	14.5 (58.1)	15.9 (60.6)	17.5 (63.5)	19.2 (66.6)	19.9 (67.8)	20.6 (69.1)	18.3 (64.9)
Record low °C (°F)	15.3 (59.5)	15.2 (59.4)	12.0 (53.6)	7.8 (46.0)	2.6 (36.7)	0.3 (32.5)	0.3 (32.5)	0.4 (32.7)	5.6 (42.1)	10.3 (50.5)	10.8 (51.4)	13.7 (56.7)	0.3 (32.5)
Average precipitation mm (inches)	274.6 (10.81)	209.9 (8.26)	158.7 (6.25)	61.7 (2.43)	66.2 (2.61)	25.4 (1.00)	24.1 (0.95)	25.4 (1.00)	53.0 (2.09)	96.8 (3.81)	111.8 (4.40)	208.4 (8.20)	1,316 (51.8)
Average precipitation days (≥ 1.0 mm)	15	13	11	5	5	2	2	2	5	8	9	15	92
Average relative humidity (%)	77.3	76.7	75.8	70.3	70.5	67.2	61.9	55.9	60.5	63.1	67.2	74.2	68.4
Mean monthly sunshine hours	155.4	174.5	204.6	218.8	216.4	218.2	239.8	249.5	186.1	190.4	195.6	173.2	2,422.5
Source: Instituto Nacional de Meteorologia (extremes 1961–1971, 1792–1983, 1986–present)

=== Hydrography ===
- São Domingos river
- ribeirão "Barro Preto"
- ribeirão "Fundo"
- ribeirão "Dos Coqueiros"
- ribeirão "Do retirinho"
- ribeirão "Jacu"

== Economy ==
The economic basis of the city is the Tertiary sector. Commerce and services corresponds to 70.5% of the GDP. The Industry is responsible for 28.5% of the city GDP. Mechanical fan is one of the main exported products of Catanduva. The cultivation and processing of sugarcane is relevant in the region.

== Demographics ==
=== Indicators ===
- Population: 119,275 (IBGE/2025)
- Area: 290.6 km^{2} (166.5 sq mi)
- Population density: 388.24/km^{2} (2,451.5/sq mi)
- Urbanization: 99.2% (2010)
- Sex ratio (Males to Females): 94.77 (2011)
- Birth rate: 12.65/1,000 inhabitants (2009)
- Infant mortality: 9.17/1,000 births (2009)
- HDI: 0.833 (UNDP/2000)

All indicators are from SEADE and IBGE

== Media ==
In telecommunications, the city was served by Telecomunicações de São Paulo. In July 1998, this company was acquired by Telefónica, which adopted the Vivo brand in 2012. The company is currently an operator of cell phones, fixed lines, internet (fiber optics/4G) and television (satellite and cable).

== Sports ==
Grêmio Catanduvense de Futebol is the city's professional football club. It replaced other now-defunct football clubs, Catanduva Esporte Clube, Grêmio Esportivo Catanduvense, Catanduva Esporte e Clube, and Clube Atlético Catanduvense. The city's stadium is the Estádio Municipal Sílvio Salles.

== Notable people ==
- Alex Sandro, football player
- Luis Paulo Supi, chess Grandmaster
- Altobeli da Silva, Brazilian distance runner
- Alan Patrick, football player
- Athos de Oliveira, swimmer

== See also ==
- List of municipalities in São Paulo
- Interior of São Paulo
