= Severinia =

Severinia can refer to:

- Severinia (plant), a genus of flowering plants in the family Rutaceae
- Severinia, a genus of mantises in the family Toxoderidae
- Severínia, a city in Brazil
