= Santa Adélia =

Municipality in Southeast Brazil

- Municipality
- The Municipality of Santa Adélia
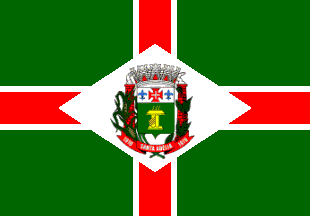
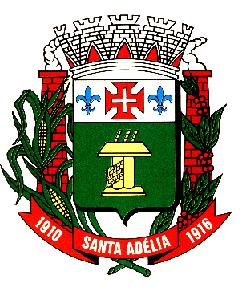
- Flag Coat of arms

- Location of Santa Adélia

- Location within Brazil
- Coordinates: 21°14′34″S 48°48′14″W
- Country: Brazil
- Region: Southeast
- State: São Paulo
- Established: 2009

Government
  - Mayor: Guilherme Colombo (DEM)

Area
  - Total: 330.9 km^{2} (127.8 sq mi)
- Elevation: 618 m (2,028 ft)

Population (2020)
  - Total: 15,561
  - Density: 43.32/km^{2} (112.2/sq mi)
- Time zone: UTC−3 (BRT)
- Postal Code: 15950-000
- Area code: +55 17
- Website: Prefecture of Santa Adélia

Santa Adélia is a municipality in the state of São Paulo, Brazil. The city has a population of 15,561 inhabitants and an area of 330.9 km^{2} (127.8 sq mi). Santa Adélia belongs to the Mesoregion of São José do Rio Preto.

== Economy ==
The Tertiary sector corresponds to 69.91% of Santa Adélia's GDP. The Primary sector is 19.73% of the GDP and the Industry corresponds to 10.36%.

== Media ==
In telecommunications, the city was served by Telecomunicações de São Paulo. In July 1998, this company was acquired by Telefónica, which adopted the Vivo brand in 2012. The company is currently an operator of cell phones, fixed lines, internet (fiber optics/4G) and television (satellite and cable).

== See also ==
- List of municipalities in São Paulo
- Interior of São Paulo
