= Palmares Paulista =

- Municipality
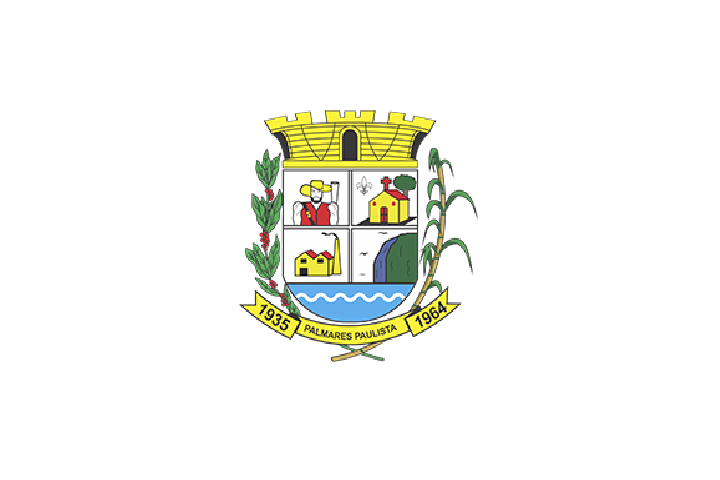
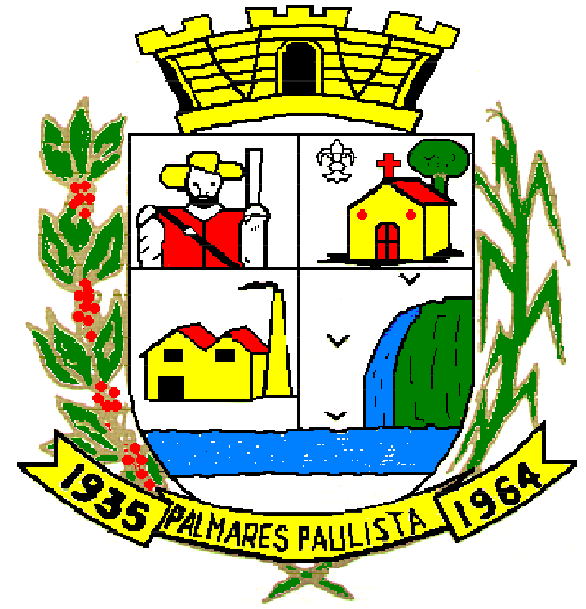
- Flag Coat of arms

- Location in São Paulo state

- Location in Brazil
- Coordinates: 21°04′58″S 48°48′03″W
- Country: Brazil
- Region: Southeast
- State: São Paulo

Government
  - Mayor: Lucas Assumção

Area
  - Total: 82.1 km^{2} (31.7 sq mi)
- Elevation: 580 m (1,900 ft)

Population (2020)
  - Total: 13,486
  - Density: 164/km^{2} (425/sq mi)
- Time zone: UTC−3 (BRT)
- Postal code: 15828-000
- Area code: +55 17
- Website: Prefecture of Palmares Paulista

Palmares Paulista is a municipality in the state of São Paulo, Brazil. The city has a population of 13,486 inhabitants and an area of 82.1 km^{2} (31.7 sq mi).

Palmares Paulista belongs to the Mesoregion of São José do Rio Preto.

== Media ==
In telecommunications, the city was served by Telecomunicações de São Paulo. In July 1998, this company was acquired by Telefónica, which adopted the Vivo brand in 2012. The company is currently an operator of cell phones, fixed lines, internet (fiber optics/4G) and television (satellite and cable).

== Notable people ==
- Matheus Aiás, footballer

== See also ==
- List of municipalities in São Paulo
- Interior of São Paulo
