= Microregion of Andradina =

- Microregion
- Location of the Microregion of Andradina
- Coordinates: 21°12′32″S 50°25′58″W
- Country: Brazil
- Region: Southeast
- State: São Paulo
- Mesoregion: Araçatuba

Area
  - Total: 6,891.6 km^{2} (2,660.9 sq mi)

Population (2010/IBGE)
  - Total: 181,710
  - Density: 26.367/km^{2} (68.290/sq mi)
- Time zone: UTC-3 (UTC-3)
  - Summer (DST): UTC-2 (UTC-2)
- Postal Code: 16000-000
- Area code: +55 18

The Microregion of Andradina (Portuguese: Microrregião de Andradina) is located on the northwest of São Paulo state, Brazil, and is made up of 11 municipalities. It belongs to the Mesoregion of Araçatuba.

The population of the Microregion is 181,710 inhabitants, in an area of 6,891.6 km²

== Municipalities ==
The microregion consists of the following municipalities, listed below with their 2010 Census populations (IBGE/2010):

- Andradina: 55,334
- Castilho: 18,003
- Guaraçaí: 8,435
- Ilha Solteira: 25,064
- Itapura: 4,357
- Mirandópolis: 27,483
- Murutinga do Sul: 4,186
- Nova Independência: 22,576
- Pereira Barreto: 24,962
- Sud Mennucci: 7,435
- Suzanápolis: 3,383

== See also ==
- Interior of São Paulo
