= Microregion of Guaratinguetá =

Coordinates: 22°48′57″S 45°11′34″W

- Microregion
- Location of Microregion of Guaratinguetá in the state of São Paulo
- Country: Brazil
- Region: Southeast
- State: São Paulo
- Mesoregion: Vale do Paraíba Paulista
- Time zone: UTC-3 (UTC-3)
  - Summer (DST): UTC-2 (UTC-2)

The Microregion of Guaratinguetá (Portuguese: Microrregião de Guaratinguetá) is a microregion in the east of São Paulo State, Brazil. The microregion is bordered by the state of Rio de Janeiro to the north.

== Municipalities ==
The microregion consists of the following municipalities:

- Aparecida
- Cachoeira Paulista
- Canas
- Cruzeiro
- Guaratinguetá
- Lavrinhas
- Lorena
- Piquete
- Potim
- Queluz
- Roseira
