= Itajobi =

- Municipality
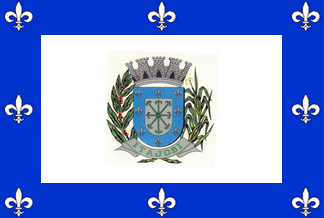
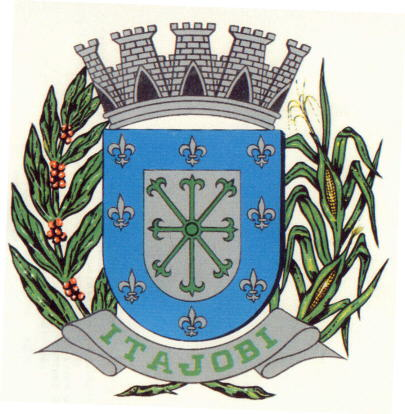
- Flag Coat of arms

- Location of Itajobi

- Location within Brazil
- Coordinates: 21°19′04″S 49°03′14″W
- Country: Brazil
- Region: Southeast
- State: São Paulo
- Established: 2009

Government
  - Mayor: Sidiomar Ujaque

Area
  - Total: 502.1 km^{2} (193.9 sq mi)
- Elevation: 453 m (1,486 ft)

Population (2022)
  - Total: 16,989
  - Density: 33.84/km^{2} (87.63/sq mi)
- Time zone: UTC−3 (BRT)
- Postal Code: 15840-053
- Area code: +55 17
- Website: Prefecture of Itajobi

Itajobi is a municipality in the state of São Paulo, Brazil. The city has a population of 16,989 inhabitants and an area of 502.1 km^{2} (193.9 sq mi).

Itajobi belongs to the Mesoregion of São José do Rio Preto.

== History ==
On June 22, 1884, Inácio Nantes da Costa and his wife established Fazenda Campo Alegre, located between the streams Papagaio, Monjolinho, Cisterna, and Queixada. By the late 19th century, German, Syrian, and Italian immigrants began arriving in the region, which was then known as Campo Alegre das Pedras.

In August 1906, the District of Peace of Itajuby was created through State Law No. 993, dated August 2, 1906. On October 26, 1918, State Law No. 1,604 established the municipality of Itajuby, which was officially constituted on April 4, 1919, after being separated from Itápolis.

As per its most recent territorial division in 1995, the municipality consists of two districts: Itajobi and Nova Cardoso.

== Media ==
In telecommunications, the city was served by Telecomunicações de São Paulo. In July 1998, this company was acquired by Telefónica, which adopted the Vivo brand in 2012. The company is currently an operator of cell phones, fixed lines, internet (fiber optics/4G) and television (satellite and cable).

== See also ==
- List of municipalities in São Paulo
