= Valentim Gentil =

- Municipality
- The Municipality of Valentim Gentil
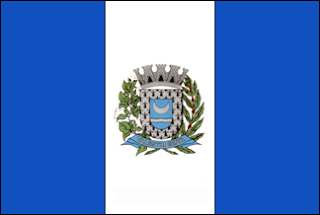
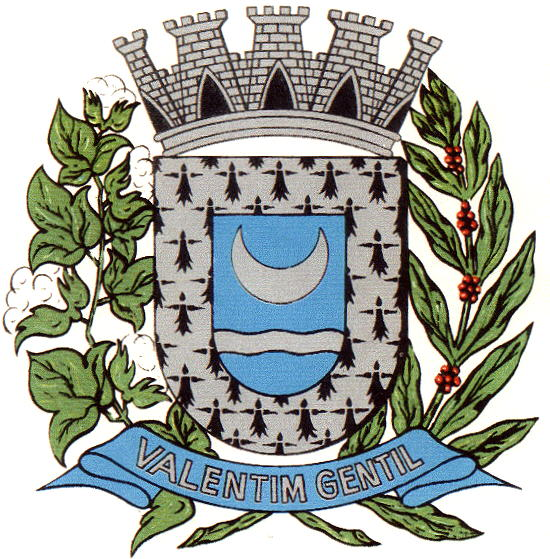
- Flag Coat of arms

- Location of Valentim Gentil

- Location within Brazil
- Coordinates: 20°25′19″S 50°05′16″W
- Country: Brazil
- Region: Southeast
- State: São Paulo
- Established: 2009

Area
  - Total: 149.7 km^{2} (57.8 sq mi)
- Elevation: 510 m (1,670 ft)

Population (2020)
  - Total: 13,532
  - Density: 73.7/km^{2} (191/sq mi)
- Time zone: UTC−3 (BRT)
- Postal Code: 15520-000
- Area code: +55 17
- Website: Prefecture of Valentim Gentil

Valentim Gentil is a municipality in the state of São Paulo, Brazil. The city has a population of 13,532 inhabitants and an area of 149.7 km^{2} (57.8 sq mi).

== History ==
The municipality was created by state law in 1948.

Map of the state of São Paulo (1948).

== Geography ==
Valentim Gentil belongs to the Mesoregion of São José do Rio Preto.

== Media ==
In telecommunications, the city was served by Companhia de Telecomunicações do Estado de São Paulo until 1975, when it began to be served by Telecomunicações de São Paulo. In July 1998, this company was acquired by Telefónica, which adopted the Vivo brand in 2012.

The company is currently an operator of cell phones, fixed lines, internet (fiber optics/4G) and television (satellite and cable).

== See also ==
- List of municipalities in São Paulo
- Interior of São Paulo
