= Tabapuã =

- Municipality
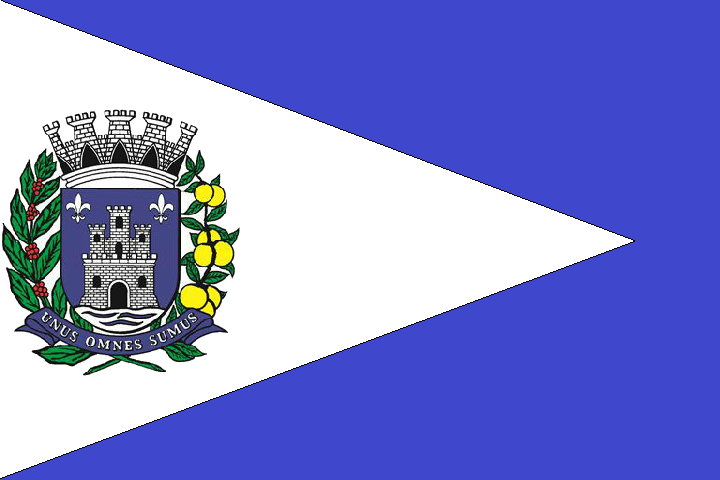
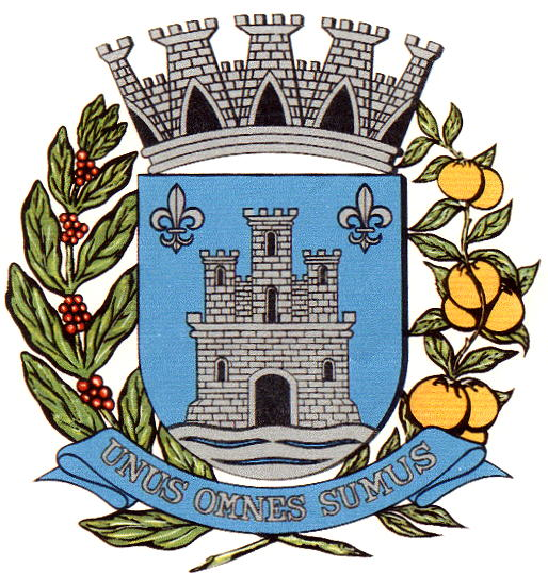
- Flag Coat of arms

- Location in São Paulo state

- Location in Brazil
- Coordinates: 20°57′50″S 49°01′55″W
- Country: Brazil
- Region: Southeast
- State: São Paulo

Government
  - Mayor: Jamil Seron

Area
  - Total: 345.6 km^{2} (133.4 sq mi)
- Elevation: 580 m (1,900 ft)

Population (2020)
  - Total: 12,485
  - Density: 36.13/km^{2} (93.56/sq mi)
- Time zone: UTC−3 (BRT)
- Postal code: 15880-000
- Area code: +55 17
- Website: www.tabapua.sp.gov.br

Tabapuã is a municipality in the state of São Paulo, Brazil. The population is 12,485 (2020 est.) in an area of 345.6 km^{2} (133.4 sq mi).

Tabapuã belongs to the Mesoregion of São José do Rio Preto.

== Media ==
In telecommunications, the city was served by Telecomunicações de São Paulo. In July 1998, this company was acquired by Telefónica, which adopted the Vivo brand in 2012. The company is currently an operator of cell phones, fixed lines, internet (fiber optics/4G) and television (satellite and cable).

== See also ==
- List of municipalities in São Paulo
- Interior of São Paulo
