= Riolândia =

- Municipality
- The Municipality of Riolândia
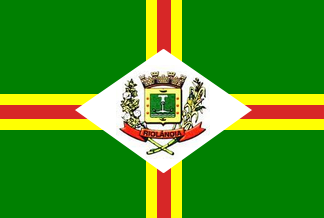
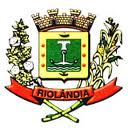
- Flag Coat of arms

- Location of Riolândia

- Location within Brazil
- Coordinates: 19°59′24″S 49°40′51″W
- Country: Brazil
- Region: Southeast
- State: São Paulo
- Established: 2009

Area
  - Total: 633.4 km^{2} (244.6 sq mi)
- Elevation: 438 m (1,437 ft)

Population (2020)
  - Total: 12,689
  - Density: 16.7/km^{2} (43/sq mi)
- Time zone: UTC−3 (BRT)
- Postal Code: 15840-000
- Area code: +55 17
- Website: Prefecture of Riolândia

Riolândia is a municipality in the state of São Paulo, Brazil. The city has a population of 12,689 inhabitants and an area of 633.4 km^{2} (244.6 sq mi).

Riolândia belongs to the Mesoregion of São José do Rio Preto.

== Media ==
In telecommunications, the city was served by Companhia Telefônica Brasileira until 1973, when it began to be served by Telecomunicações de São Paulo. In July 1998, this company was acquired by Telefónica, which adopted the Vivo brand in 2012.

The company is currently an operator of cell phones, fixed lines, internet (fiber optics/4G) and television (satellite and cable).

== See also ==
- List of municipalities in São Paulo
- Interior of São Paulo
