= Urânia =

- Municipality
- The Municipality of Urânia
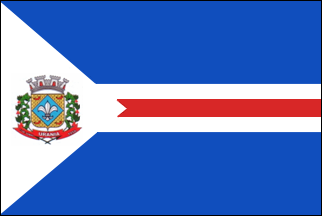
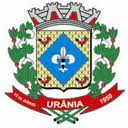
- Flag Coat of arms

- Location of Urânia

- Location within Brazil
- Coordinates: 20°14′45″S 50°38′34″W
- Country: Brazil
- Region: Southeast
- State: São Paulo
- Established: 2009

Area
  - Total: 208.9 km^{2} (80.7 sq mi)
- Elevation: 458 m (1,503 ft)

Population (2020)
  - Total: 9,120
  - Density: 42.2/km^{2} (109/sq mi)
- Time zone: UTC−3 (BRT)
- Postal Code: 15760-000
- Area code: +55 17
- Website: Prefecture of Urânia

Urânia is a municipality in the state of São Paulo, Brazil. The city has a population of 9,120 inhabitants and an area of 208.9 km^{2} (80.7 sq mi).

Urânia belongs to the Mesoregion of São José do Rio Preto.

== Media ==
In telecommunications, the city was served by Telecomunicações de São Paulo. In July 1998, this company was acquired by Telefónica, which adopted the Vivo brand in 2012. The company is currently an operator of cell phones, fixed lines, internet (fiber optics/4G) and television (satellite and cable).

== See also ==
- List of municipalities in São Paulo
