= Aparecida d'Oeste =

- Municipality
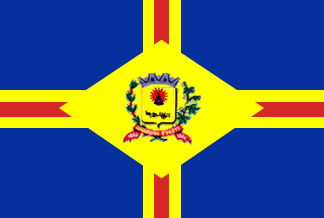
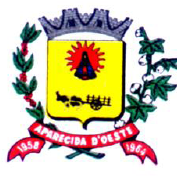
- Flag Coat of arms

- Location in São Paulo state

- Location in Brazil
- Coordinates: 20°27′0″S 50°52′48″W
- Country: Brazil
- Region: Southeast
- State: São Paulo

Area
  - Total: 179 km^{2} (69 sq mi)

Population (2020)
  - Total: 4,158
  - Density: 23.2/km^{2} (60.2/sq mi)
- Time zone: UTC−3 (BRT)

Aparecida d'Oeste is a Brazilian municipality of the state of São Paulo. The population is 4,158 (2020 est.) in an area of 179 km^{2}.

== Demographics ==
Historical population (municipality)
Year	Population	%±
1970	7,919	—
1980	5,148	−35.0%
1991	5,100	−0.9%
2000	4,935	−3.2%
2010	4,450	−9.8%
2022	4,086	−8.2%
Est. 2024	4,124	0.9%

== Media ==
In telecommunications, the city was served by Companhia de Telecomunicações do Estado de São Paulo until 1975, when it began to be served by Telecomunicações de São Paulo. In July 1998, this company was acquired by Telefónica, which adopted the Vivo brand in 2012.

The company is currently an operator of cell phones, fixed lines, internet (fiber optics/4G) and television (satellite and cable).

== See also ==
- List of municipalities in São Paulo
- Interior of São Paulo
