= Três Fronteiras =

- Municipality
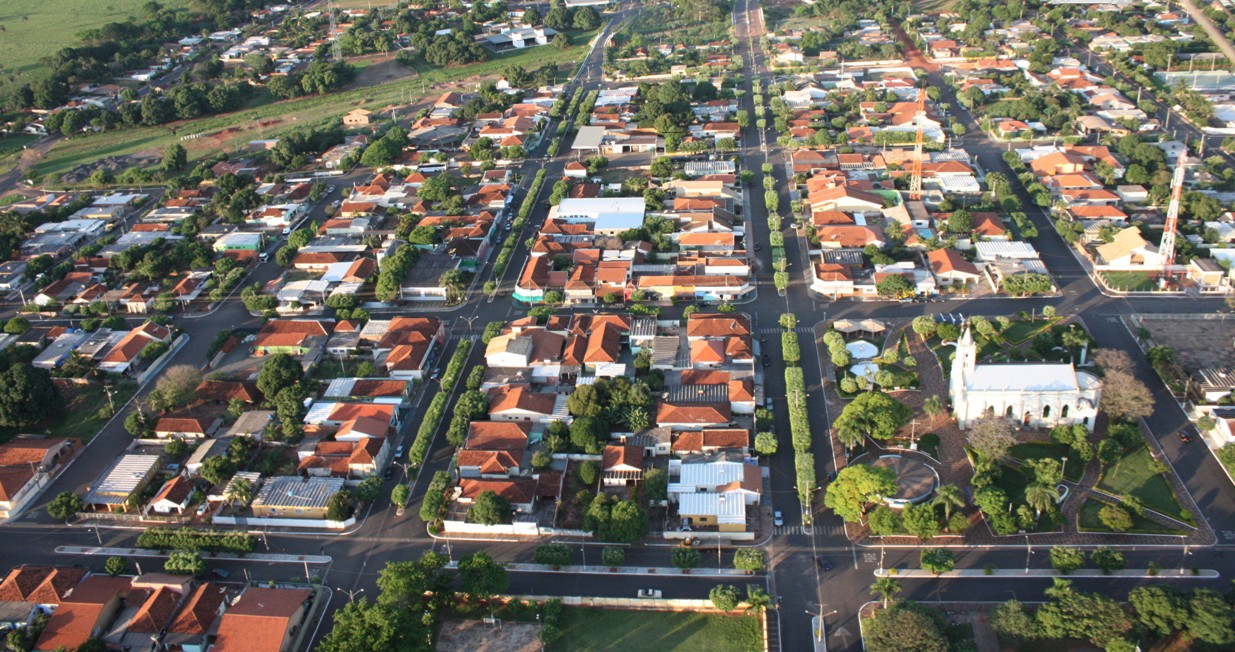
- View of Três Fronteiras

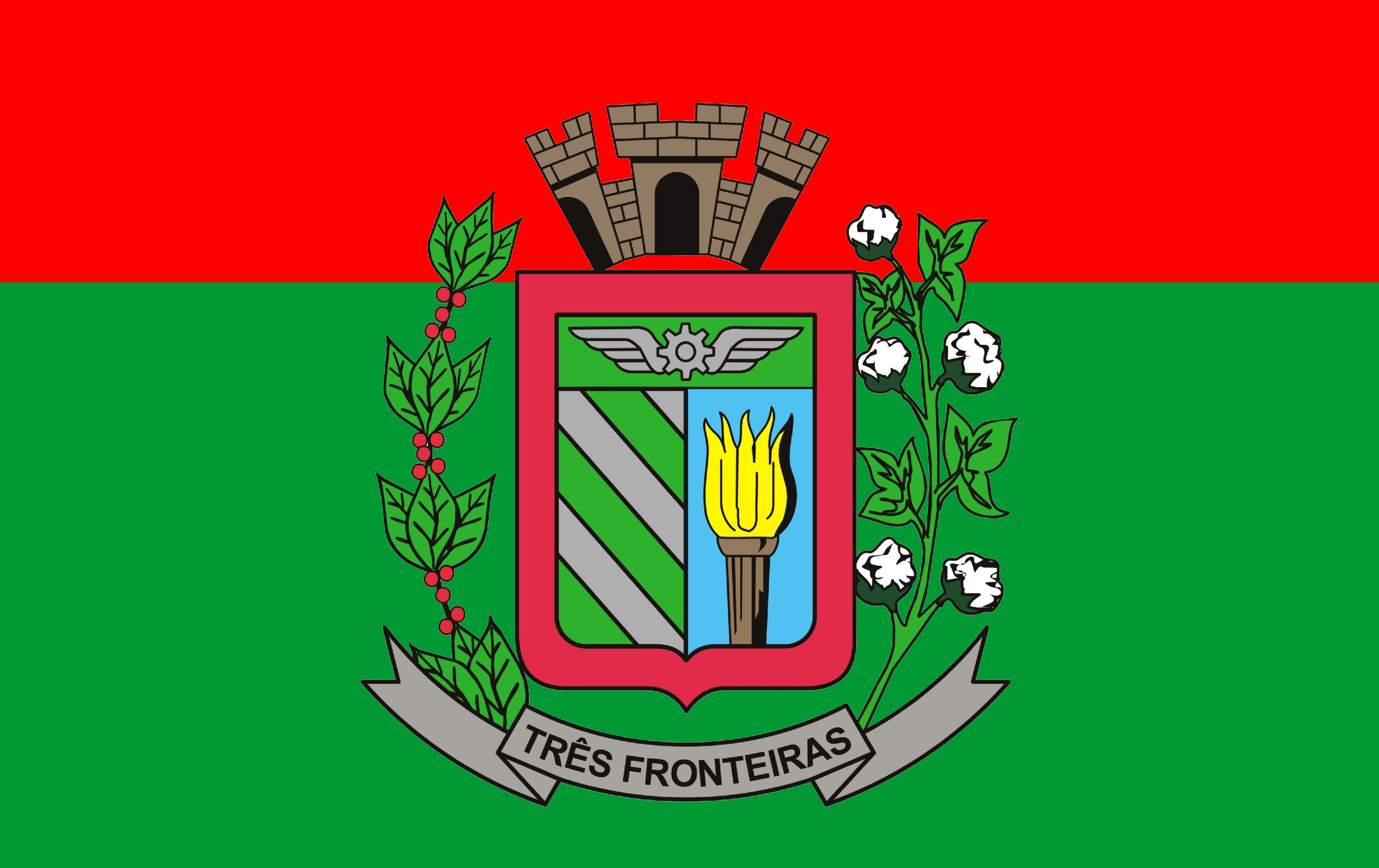
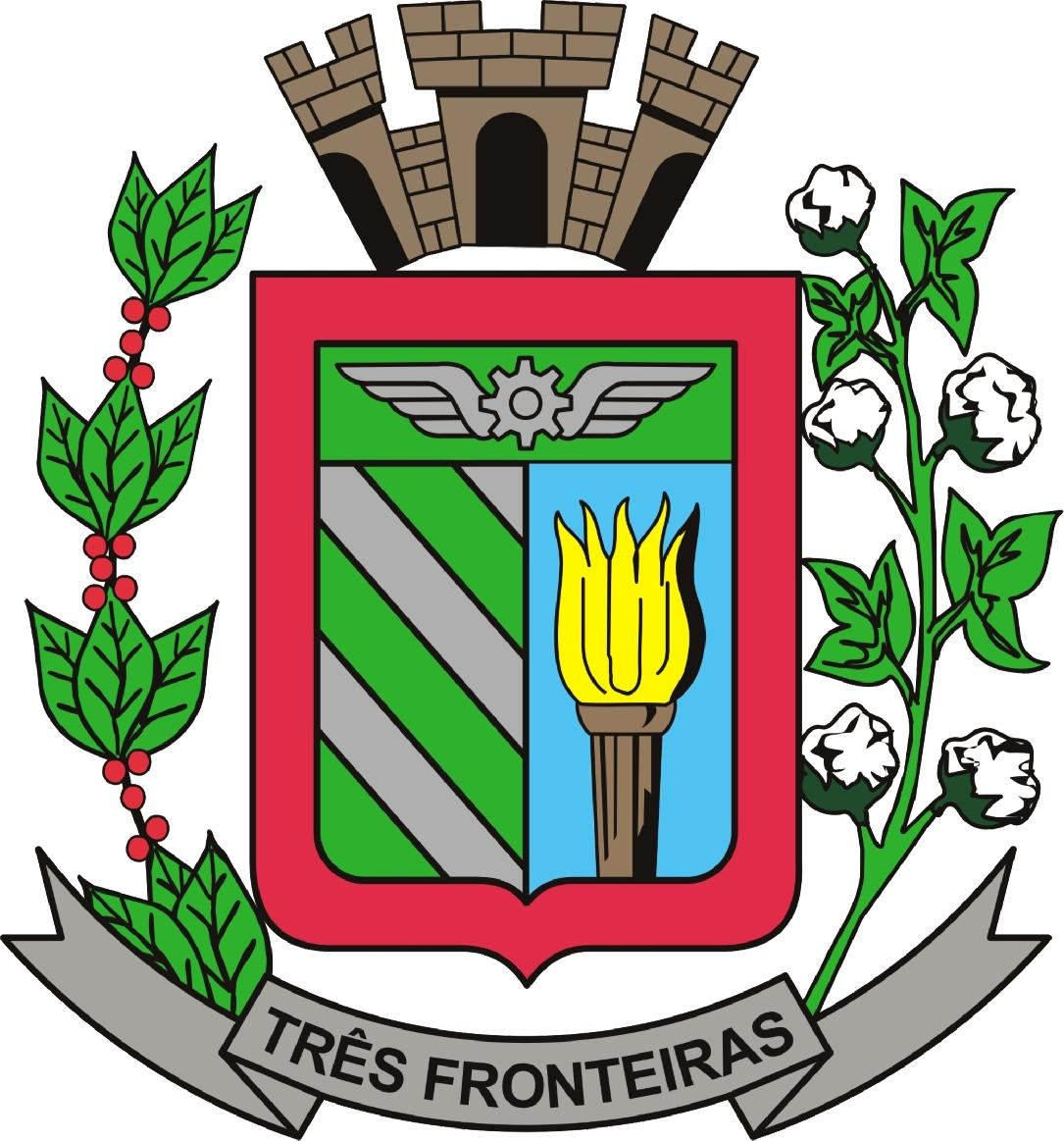
- Flag Coat of arms

- Location in São Paulo state

- Location in Brazil
- Coordinates: 20°14′6″S 50°53′25″W
- Country: Brazil
- Region: Southeast
- State: São Paulo

Area
  - Total: 151.59 km^{2} (58.53 sq mi)

Population (2020)
  - Total: 5,832
  - Density: 38.47/km^{2} (99.64/sq mi)
- Time zone: UTC−3 (BRT)

Três Fronteiras (Portuguese meaning "three borders") is a municipality in the state of São Paulo in Brazil. The population is 5,832 (2020 est.) in an area of 151.59 km^{2} (58.53 sq mi). The elevation is 395 metres (1,296 ft). The name Três Fronteiras refers to the nearby tripoint of the states São Paulo, Minas Gerais and Mato Grosso do Sul, but the municipality does not touch this tripoint. Most of the population are farmers. Its existence is the result of the unification of two provinces: Marcondes Filho and São José da Alegria.

== Media ==
In telecommunications, the city was served by Telecomunicações de São Paulo. In July 1998, this company was acquired by Telefónica, which adopted the Vivo brand in 2012. The company is currently an operator of cell phones, fixed lines, internet (fiber optics/4G) and television (satellite and cable).

== See also ==
- List of municipalities in São Paulo
- Interior of São Paulo
