= Paraíso, São Paulo =

Paraíso
- Municipality
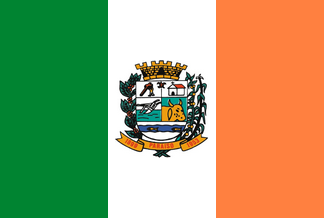
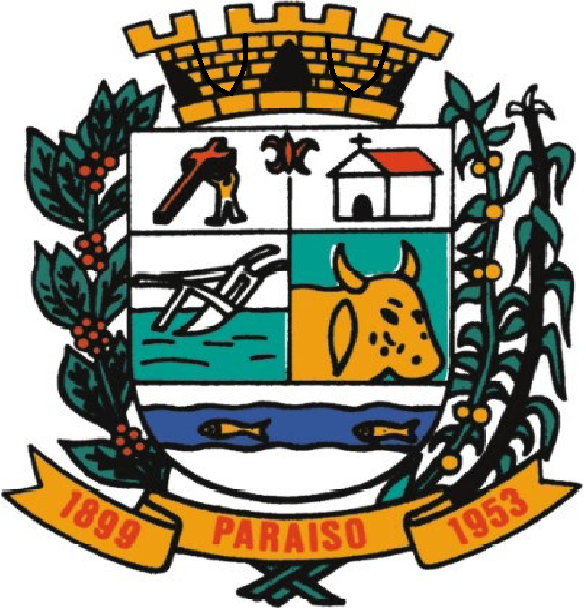
- Flag Coat of arms

- Location in São Paulo state

- Location in Brazil
- Coordinates: 21°0′59″S 48°46′25″W
- Country: Brazil
- Region: Southeast
- State: São Paulo

Area
  - Total: 155 km^{2} (60 sq mi)

Population (2020)
  - Total: 6,496
  - Density: 41.9/km^{2} (109/sq mi)
- Time zone: UTC−3 (BRT)

Paraíso is a municipality in the state of São Paulo, Brazil. Its population is 6,496 (2020 est.), and its area 155 km^{2}. Its elevation is 598 m.

== Media ==
In telecommunications, the city was served by Telecomunicações de São Paulo. In July 1998, this company was acquired by Telefónica, which adopted the Vivo brand in 2012. The company is currently an operator of cell phones, fixed lines, internet (fiber optics/4G) and television (satellite and cable).

== See also ==
- List of municipalities in São Paulo
- Interior of São Paulo
