= Urupês =

- Municipality
- The Municipality of Urupês
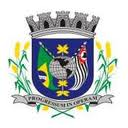
- Flag Coat of arms
- Nickname: Heart's city ("Cidade coração")
- Motto: Progressum in operam ("In the work, the progress")
- Location of Urupês

- Location within Brazil
- Coordinates: 21°12′07″S 49°17′24″W
- Country: Brazil
- Region: Southeast
- State: São Paulo
- Founded: September 24, 1928
- Birthday: September 24

Government
  - Mayor: Alcemir Cássio Gréggio ("Bica") (PTB)
  - Vice-Mayor: Maria Luiza Gimpani da Silva
  - Chamber President: Armando Aparecido Donizeti Sardella

Area
  - Total: 323.7 km^{2} (125.0 sq mi)
- Elevation: 449 m (1,473 ft)

Population (2020)
  - Total: 13,888
  - Density: 39.27/km^{2} (101.7/sq mi)
- Demonym: urupeense
- Time zone: UTC−3 (BRT)
- Postal Code: 15850-000
- Area code: +55 17
- Website: Prefecture of Urupês

Urupês is a municipality in the state of São Paulo, Brazil. The city has a population of 13,888 inhabitants and covers an area of 323.7 km^{2} (125.0 sq mi).

Urupês is located in the northwest of the São Paulo State and belongs to the Mesoregion of Novo Horizonte.

== Media ==
In telecommunications, the city was served by Telecomunicações de São Paulo. In July 1998, this company was acquired by Telefónica, which adopted the Vivo brand in 2012. The company is currently an operator of cell phones, fixed lines, internet (fiber optics/4G) and television (satellite and cable).

== See also ==
- List of municipalities in São Paulo
- Interior of São Paulo
