= Mesoregions of Brazil =

Former subdivision of the Brazilian states

A mesoregion (Portuguese: Mesorregião) was a subdivision of the Brazilian states, grouping various municipalities in proximity and with common characteristics. They were abolished in 2017 and replaced by intermediate and immediate geographic regions. The mesoregions were created by the Brazilian Institute of Geography and Statistics for statistical purposes and did not, therefore, constitute political or administrative areas. They were further divided into microregions.

== List of mesoregions ==
As of 2014, there were 5,570 municipalities, divided among 558 microregions and 137 mesoregions:

State	Mesoregions	Microregions	Municipalities
Central-West Brazil	15	52	466
Federal District	1	1	1
Goiás	5	18	246
Mato Grosso	5	22	141
Mato Grosso do Sul	4	11	79
Northeast Brazil	42	188	1794
Alagoas	3	13	102
Bahia	7	32	417
Ceará	7	33	184
Maranhão	5	21	217
Paraíba	4	23	223
Pernambuco	5	19	185
Piauí	4	15	224
Rio Grande do Norte	4	19	167
Sergipe	3	13	75
North Brazil	20	64	450
Acre	2	5	22
Amapá	2	4	16
Amazonas	4	13	62
Pará	6	22	144
Rondônia	2	8	52
Roraima	2	4	15
Tocantins	2	8	139
Southeast Brazil	37	160	1668
Espírito Santo	4	13	78
Minas Gerais	12	66	853
Rio de Janeiro	6	18	92
São Paulo	15	63	645
South Brazil	23	94	1191
Paraná	10	39	399
Rio Grande do Sul	7	35	497
Santa Catarina	6	20	295
Total	136	557	5569
