= Pracinha =

Pracinha can refer to:

- Pracinha, a municipality in São Paulo, Brazil.
- A member of the Brazilian Expeditionary Force of World War II.
