= Guarantã =

- Municipality
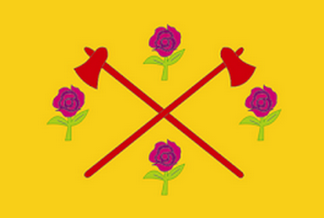
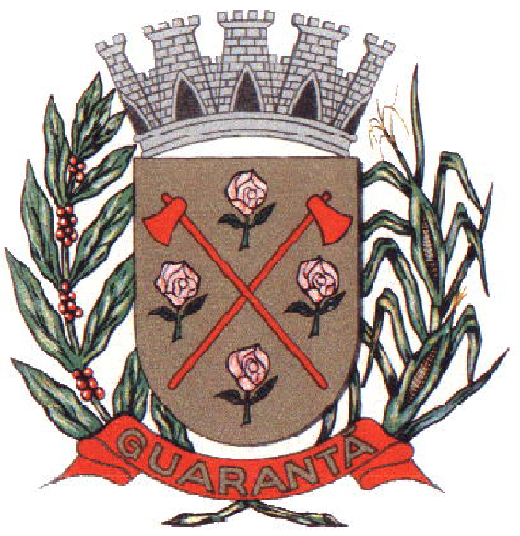
- Flag Coat of arms

- Location in São Paulo state

- Location in Brazil
- Coordinates: 21°53′42″S 49°35′23″W
- Country: Brazil
- Region: Southeast
- State: São Paulo

Area
  - Total: 462 km^{2} (178 sq mi)

Population (2020)
  - Total: 6,675
  - Density: 14.4/km^{2} (37.4/sq mi)
- Time zone: UTC−3 (BRT)

Guarantã is a municipality in the state of São Paulo in Brazil. The population is 6,675 (2020 est.) in an area of 462 km^{2} (178 sq mi). The elevation is 505 m.

== History ==
The municipality was created by state law in 1944.

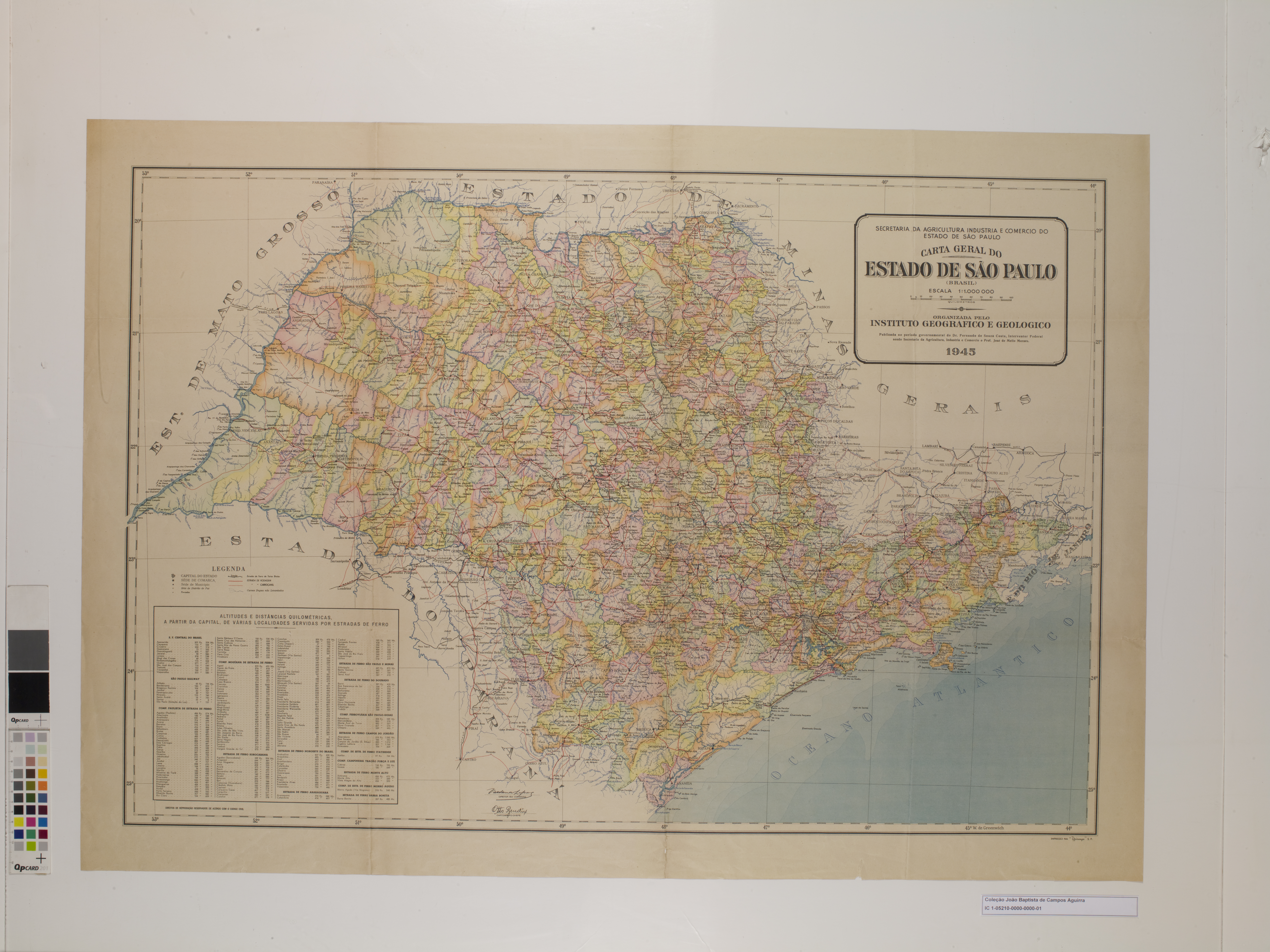
Map of the state of São Paulo (1944).

== Media ==
In telecommunications, the city was served by Companhia Telefônica Brasileira until 1973, when it began to be served by Telecomunicações de São Paulo. In July 1998, this company was acquired by Telefónica, which adopted the Vivo brand in 2012.

The company is currently an operator of cell phones, fixed lines, internet (fiber optics/4G) and television (satellite and cable).

== See also ==
- List of municipalities in São Paulo
