= List of municipalities in São Paulo =

This is a list of the municipalities in the state of São Paulo (SP), located in the Southeast Region of Brazil.

São Paulo is divided into 645 municipalities, which, since 2017, have been grouped into 11 intermediate and 53 immediate regions.

== List ==
Intermediate Region	Immediate Region	Municipality	Population (2022 census)	Area (km^{2})
Araçatuba	Andradina	Andradina	59,783	964.2
Araçatuba	Andradina	Castilho	19,977	1,065
Araçatuba	Andradina	Guaraçaí	7,441	569.2
Araçatuba	Andradina	Ilha Solteira	25,549	652.6
Araçatuba	Andradina	Itapura	3,979	301.7
Araçatuba	Andradina	Lavínia	9,689	537.7
Araçatuba	Andradina	Mirandópolis	27,983	917.7
Araçatuba	Andradina	Murutinga do Sul	3,737	250.9
Araçatuba	Andradina	Nova Independência	4,609	265.0
Araçatuba	Andradina	Pereira Barreto	24,095	974.2
Araçatuba	Andradina	Sud Mennucci	7,355	594.7
Araçatuba	Araçatuba	Araçatuba	200,124	1,167
Araçatuba	Araçatuba	Auriflama	13,692	434.5
Araçatuba	Araçatuba	Bento de Abreu	2,606	301.7
Araçatuba	Araçatuba	Gastão Vidigal	3,252	180.6
Araçatuba	Araçatuba	General Salgado	10,312	494.4
Araçatuba	Araçatuba	Guararapes	31,043	955.6
Araçatuba	Araçatuba	Guzolândia	4,246	252.5
Araçatuba	Araçatuba	Magda	3,165	312.3
Araçatuba	Araçatuba	Monções	1,937	104.4
Araçatuba	Araçatuba	Nova Castilho	1,062	183.4
Araçatuba	Araçatuba	Nova Luzitânia	2,837	73.82
Araçatuba	Araçatuba	Rubiácea	2,700	236.5
Araçatuba	Araçatuba	Santo Antônio do Aracanguá	8,379	1,308
Araçatuba	Araçatuba	Valparaíso	24,241	857.7
Araçatuba	Birigui - Penápolis	Alto Alegre	3,841	318.6
Araçatuba	Birigui - Penápolis	Avanhandava	11,263	338.4
Araçatuba	Birigui - Penápolis	Barbosa	5,640	205.2
Araçatuba	Birigui - Penápolis	Bilac	7,319	158.0
Araçatuba	Birigui - Penápolis	Birigui	118,979	530.0
Araçatuba	Birigui - Penápolis	Braúna	5,356	195.2
Araçatuba	Birigui - Penápolis	Brejo Alegre	2,565	105.7
Araçatuba	Birigui - Penápolis	Buritama	17,210	326.9
Araçatuba	Birigui - Penápolis	Clementina	6,982	168.6
Araçatuba	Birigui - Penápolis	Coroados	5,400	246.8
Araçatuba	Birigui - Penápolis	Gabriel Monteiro	2,763	138.7
Araçatuba	Birigui - Penápolis	Glicério	4,138	272.8
Araçatuba	Birigui - Penápolis	Lourdes	1,950	113.9
Araçatuba	Birigui - Penápolis	Luiziânia	4,701	166.6
Araçatuba	Birigui - Penápolis	Penápolis	61,679	711.3
Araçatuba	Birigui - Penápolis	Piacatu	5,519	232.5
Araçatuba	Birigui - Penápolis	Santópolis do Aguapeí	3,899	128.0
Araçatuba	Birigui - Penápolis	Turiúba	1,818	153.2
Araçatuba	Birigui - Penápolis	Zacarias	2,692	319.1
Araraquara	Araraquara	Américo Brasiliense	33,019	123.0
Araraquara	Araraquara	Araraquara	242,228	1,004
Araraquara	Araraquara	Boa Esperança do Sul	13,135	690.7
Araraquara	Araraquara	Borborema	14,226	552.3
Araraquara	Araraquara	Cândido Rodrigues	2,889	70.89
Araraquara	Araraquara	Dobrada	8,759	149.7
Araraquara	Araraquara	Gavião Peixoto	4,702	243.8
Araraquara	Araraquara	Ibitinga	60,033	689.4
Araraquara	Araraquara	Itápolis	40,464	996.7
Araraquara	Araraquara	Matão	79,033	524.9
Araraquara	Araraquara	Motuca	4,034	228.7
Araraquara	Araraquara	Nova Europa	9,311	160.3
Araraquara	Araraquara	Rincão	9,098	316.6
Araraquara	Araraquara	Santa Lúcia	7,149	153.9
Araraquara	Araraquara	Tabatinga	14,769	368.6
Araraquara	Araraquara	Taquaritinga	52,260	594.3
Araraquara	Araraquara	Trabiju	1,682	63.42
Araraquara	São Carlos	Descalvado	31,756	753.7
Araraquara	São Carlos	Dourado	8,096	205.9
Araraquara	São Carlos	Ibaté	32,178	291.0
Araraquara	São Carlos	Itirapina	16,148	564.6
Araraquara	São Carlos	Pirassununga	73,545	727.1
Araraquara	São Carlos	Porto Ferreira	52,649	244.9
Araraquara	São Carlos	Ribeirão Bonito	10,989	471.6
Araraquara	São Carlos	Santa Rita do Passa Quatro	24,833	754.1
Araraquara	São Carlos	São Carlos	254,857	1,137
Bauru	Bauru	Agudos	37,680	966.7
Bauru	Bauru	Arealva	8,130	506.2
Bauru	Bauru	Avaí	4,483	540.7
Bauru	Bauru	Balbinos	3,887	91.64
Bauru	Bauru	Bauru	379,146	667.7
Bauru	Bauru	Borebi	2,713	348.0
Bauru	Bauru	Cabrália Paulista	4,299	240.0
Bauru	Bauru	Duartina	12,328	264.6
Bauru	Bauru	Iacanga	10,437	547.4
Bauru	Bauru	Lençóis Paulista	66,505	809.5
Bauru	Bauru	Lucianópolis	2,372	189.5
Bauru	Bauru	Macatuba	16,829	224.5
Bauru	Bauru	Paulistânia	2,090	256.2
Bauru	Bauru	Pederneiras	44,827	727.5
Bauru	Bauru	Pirajuí	22,431	823.8
Bauru	Bauru	Piratininga	15,108	402.4
Bauru	Bauru	Presidente Alves	3,804	286.6
Bauru	Bauru	Reginópolis	7,662	410.4
Bauru	Bauru	Ubirajara	5,132	282.2
Bauru	Botucatu	Anhembi	5,674	736.6
Bauru	Botucatu	Areiópolis	10,130	85.91
Bauru	Botucatu	Bofete	10,460	653.5
Bauru	Botucatu	Botucatu	145,155	1,483
Bauru	Botucatu	Conchas	15,232	466.1
Bauru	Botucatu	Itatinga	19,070	979.8
Bauru	Botucatu	Pardinho	7,153	209.9
Bauru	Botucatu	Pratânia	5,126	175.1
Bauru	Botucatu	São Manuel	37,289	650.7
Bauru	Jaú	Bariri	31,595	444.4
Bauru	Jaú	Barra Bonita	34,346	150.1
Bauru	Jaú	Bocaina	11,259	363.9
Bauru	Jaú	Boraceia	4,715	122.1
Bauru	Jaú	Brotas	23,898	1,101
Bauru	Jaú	Dois Córregos	24,510	633.0
Bauru	Jaú	Igaraçu do Tietê	23,106	97.75
Bauru	Jaú	Itaju	3,618	230.4
Bauru	Jaú	Itapuí	13,659	140.0
Bauru	Jaú	Jaú	133,497	687.1
Bauru	Jaú	Mineiros do Tietê	11,230	213.2
Bauru	Jaú	Torrinha	9,335	315.3
Bauru	Lins	Cafelândia	16,654	920.3
Bauru	Lins	Guaiçara	11,239	277.2
Bauru	Lins	Guarantã	6,427	461.7
Bauru	Lins	Lins	74,779	570.1
Bauru	Lins	Pongaí	3,395	183.4
Bauru	Lins	Promissão	35,131	779.2
Bauru	Lins	Sabino	5,112	305.3
Bauru	Lins	Uru	1,387	146.9
Campinas	Amparo	Águas de Lindoia	17,930	60.13
Campinas	Amparo	Amparo	68,008	445.3
Campinas	Amparo	Lindóia	7,014	48.76
Campinas	Amparo	Monte Alegre do Sul	8,627	110.3
Campinas	Amparo	Serra Negra	29,894	203.7
Campinas	Araras	Araras	130,866	644.8
Campinas	Araras	Conchal	28,101	182.8
Campinas	Araras	Leme	98,161	402.9
Campinas	Araras	Santa Cruz da Conceição	4,277	150.1
Campinas	Bragança Paulista	Atibaia	158,647	478.5
Campinas	Bragança Paulista	Bom Jesus dos Perdões	22,006	108.4
Campinas	Bragança Paulista	Bragança Paulista	176,811	512.6
Campinas	Bragança Paulista	Joanópolis	12,815	374.3
Campinas	Bragança Paulista	Nazaré Paulista	18,217	326.3
Campinas	Bragança Paulista	Pedra Bela	6,557	158.6
Campinas	Bragança Paulista	Pinhalzinho	15,224	154.5
Campinas	Bragança Paulista	Piracaia	26,029	385.6
Campinas	Bragança Paulista	Socorro	40,122	449.0
Campinas	Bragança Paulista	Tuiuti	6,778	126.7
Campinas	Bragança Paulista	Vargem	10,512	142.6
Campinas	Campinas	Americana	237,240	133.9
Campinas	Campinas	Artur Nogueira	51,456	178.0
Campinas	Campinas	Campinas	1,139,047	794.6
Campinas	Campinas	Cosmópolis	59,773	154.7
Campinas	Campinas	Elias Fausto	17,699	202.4
Campinas	Campinas	Holambra	15,094	65.58
Campinas	Campinas	Hortolândia	236,641	62.42
Campinas	Campinas	Indaiatuba	255,748	311.5
Campinas	Campinas	Jaguariúna	59,347	141.4
Campinas	Campinas	Monte Mor	64,662	240.6
Campinas	Campinas	Nova Odessa	62,019	73.79
Campinas	Campinas	Paulínia	110,537	138.8
Campinas	Campinas	Pedreira	43,112	108.8
Campinas	Campinas	Santa Bárbara d'Oeste	183,347	271.0
Campinas	Campinas	Santo Antônio de Posse	23,244	154.1
Campinas	Campinas	Sumaré	279,545	153.5
Campinas	Campinas	Valinhos	126,373	148.5
Campinas	Campinas	Vinhedo	76,540	80.95
Campinas	Jundiaí	Cabreúva	47,011	260.2
Campinas	Jundiaí	Campo Limpo Paulista	77,632	79.40
Campinas	Jundiaí	Itatiba	121,590	322.3
Campinas	Jundiaí	Itupeva	70,616	200.9
Campinas	Jundiaí	Jarinu	37,535	207.5
Campinas	Jundiaí	Jundiaí	443,221	431.2
Campinas	Jundiaí	Louveira	51,847	55.74
Campinas	Jundiaí	Morungaba	13,720	146.8
Campinas	Jundiaí	Várzea Paulista	115,771	35.12
Campinas	Limeira	Cordeirópolis	24,514	137.6
Campinas	Limeira	Engenheiro Coelho	19,566	109.9
Campinas	Limeira	Iracemápolis	21,967	115.1
Campinas	Limeira	Limeira	291,869	580.7
Campinas	Mogi Guaçu	Estiva Gerbi	11,295	74.14
Campinas	Mogi Guaçu	Itapira	72,022	518.4
Campinas	Mogi Guaçu	Mogi Guaçu	153,658	812.8
Campinas	Mogi Guaçu	Mogi Mirim	92,558	497.7
Campinas	Piracicaba	Águas de São Pedro	2,780	3.612
Campinas	Piracicaba	Capivari	50,068	322.9
Campinas	Piracicaba	Charqueada	15,535	175.8
Campinas	Piracicaba	Laranjal Paulista	26,261	384.3
Campinas	Piracicaba	Mombuca	3,722	133.7
Campinas	Piracicaba	Piracicaba	423,323	1,378
Campinas	Piracicaba	Rafard	8,965	121.6
Campinas	Piracicaba	Rio das Pedras	31,328	226.7
Campinas	Piracicaba	Saltinho	8,161	99.74
Campinas	Piracicaba	Santa Maria da Serra	5,243	252.6
Campinas	Piracicaba	São Pedro	38,256	611.3
Campinas	Rio Claro	Analândia	4,589	326.0
Campinas	Rio Claro	Corumbataí	4,195	278.6
Campinas	Rio Claro	Ipeúna	6,831	190.0
Campinas	Rio Claro	Rio Claro	201,418	498.4
Campinas	Rio Claro	Santa Gertrudes	23,611	98.29
Campinas	São João da Boa Vista	Aguaí	32,072	474.6
Campinas	São João da Boa Vista	Águas da Prata	7,369	142.7
Campinas	São João da Boa Vista	Casa Branca	28,083	864.2
Campinas	São João da Boa Vista	Espírito Santo do Pinhal	39,816	389.2
Campinas	São João da Boa Vista	Santa Cruz das Palmeiras	28,864	295.3
Campinas	São João da Boa Vista	Santo Antônio do Jardim	6,126	110.0
Campinas	São João da Boa Vista	São João da Boa Vista	92,547	516.4
Campinas	São João da Boa Vista	Tambaú	21,435	561.8
Campinas	São João da Boa Vista	Vargem Grande do Sul	40,133	267.2
Campinas	São José do Rio Pardo - Mococa	Caconde	17,101	468.2
Campinas	São José do Rio Pardo - Mococa	Divinolândia	11,158	223.7
Campinas	São José do Rio Pardo - Mococa	Itobi	8,046	139.0
Campinas	São José do Rio Pardo - Mococa	Mococa	67,681	855.2
Campinas	São José do Rio Pardo - Mococa	São José do Rio Pardo	52,205	419.7
Campinas	São José do Rio Pardo - Mococa	São Sebastião da Grama	10,441	252.4
Campinas	São José do Rio Pardo - Mococa	Tapiratiba	11,816	221.9
Marília	Assis	Assis	101,409	460.6
Marília	Assis	Borá	907	119.0
Marília	Assis	Cândido Mota	29,449	595.8
Marília	Assis	Cruzália	2,108	149.3
Marília	Assis	Florínea	3,851	225.9
Marília	Assis	Lutécia	2,661	475.2
Marília	Assis	Maracaí	12,673	533.5
Marília	Assis	Palmital	19,594	548.4
Marília	Assis	Paraguaçu Paulista	41,120	1,001
Marília	Assis	Pedrinhas Paulista	2,804	152.3
Marília	Assis	Platina	3,025	327.5
Marília	Assis	Tarumã	14,882	302.9
Marília	Marília	Álvaro de Carvalho	4,808	153.7
Marília	Marília	Alvinlândia	2,885	84.88
Marília	Marília	Campos Novos Paulista	4,888	484.2
Marília	Marília	Echaporã	6,205	515.3
Marília	Marília	Fernão	1,656	100.5
Marília	Marília	Gália	6,380	355.9
Marília	Marília	Garça	42,110	555.8
Marília	Marília	Getulina	10,232	676.8
Marília	Marília	Guaimbê	5,512	217.8
Marília	Marília	Júlio Mesquita	4,308	128.2
Marília	Marília	Lupércio	3,981	155.2
Marília	Marília	Marília	237,627	1,171
Marília	Marília	Ocauçu	4,331	301.0
Marília	Marília	Oriente	6,085	218.7
Marília	Marília	Oscar Bressane	2,470	222.1
Marília	Marília	Pompeia	20,196	784.7
Marília	Marília	Quintana	7,038	318.9
Marília	Marília	Vera Cruz	10,176	247.7
Marília	Ourinhos	Bernardino de Campos	11,607	244.2
Marília	Ourinhos	Canitar	6,283	57.46
Marília	Ourinhos	Chavantes	12,211	188.7
Marília	Ourinhos	Espírito Santo do Turvo	4,157	193.7
Marília	Ourinhos	Ibirarema	6,385	228.2
Marília	Ourinhos	Ipaussu	13,712	209.6
Marília	Ourinhos	Ourinhos	103,970	295.8
Marília	Ourinhos	Ribeirão do Sul	4,677	203.2
Marília	Ourinhos	Salto Grande	9,050	188.4
Marília	Ourinhos	Santa Cruz do Rio Pardo	46,442	1,115
Marília	Ourinhos	São Pedro do Turvo	7,217	731.2
Marília	Piraju	Fartura	16,641	429.2
Marília	Piraju	Piraju	29,436	504.6
Marília	Piraju	Sarutaiá	3,704	141.6
Marília	Piraju	Tejupá	4,127	296.2
Marília	Piraju	Timburi	2,464	196.8
Marília	Tupã	Arco-Íris	2,044	264.9
Marília	Tupã	Bastos	21,503	170.9
Marília	Tupã	Herculândia	9,125	364.3
Marília	Tupã	Iacri	6,131	321.9
Marília	Tupã	Parapuã	10,580	366.7
Marília	Tupã	Queiroz	3,265	234.9
Marília	Tupã	Rinópolis	9,259	358.5
Marília	Tupã	Tupã	63,928	628.0
Presidente Prudente	Adamantina - Lucélia	Adamantina	34,687	412.0
Presidente Prudente	Adamantina - Lucélia	Flórida Paulista	12,958	524.1
Presidente Prudente	Adamantina - Lucélia	Inúbia Paulista	3,615	87.12
Presidente Prudente	Adamantina - Lucélia	Lucélia	20,061	314.8
Presidente Prudente	Adamantina - Lucélia	Mariápolis	3,513	186.5
Presidente Prudente	Adamantina - Lucélia	Osvaldo Cruz	31,272	248.0
Presidente Prudente	Adamantina - Lucélia	Pacaembu	14,877	339.4
Presidente Prudente	Adamantina - Lucélia	Pracinha	2,578	63.05
Presidente Prudente	Adamantina - Lucélia	Sagres	2,474	147.9
Presidente Prudente	Adamantina - Lucélia	Salmourão	4,808	172.9
Presidente Prudente	Dracena	Dracena	45,474	487.7
Presidente Prudente	Dracena	Flora Rica	1,487	224.7
Presidente Prudente	Dracena	Irapuru	7,085	214.5
Presidente Prudente	Dracena	Junqueirópolis	20,448	582.6
Presidente Prudente	Dracena	Monte Castelo	4,222	233.5
Presidente Prudente	Dracena	Nova Guataporanga	2,156	34.16
Presidente Prudente	Dracena	Ouro Verde	7,779	266.8
Presidente Prudente	Dracena	Panorama	14,964	356.1
Presidente Prudente	Dracena	Pauliceia	7,955	374.1
Presidente Prudente	Dracena	Santa Mercedes	2,956	166.8
Presidente Prudente	Dracena	São João do Pau d'Alho	2,242	117.7
Presidente Prudente	Dracena	Tupi Paulista	15,854	244.8
Presidente Prudente	Presidente Epitácio-Presidente Venceslau	Caiuá	5,466	551.2
Presidente Prudente	Presidente Epitácio-Presidente Venceslau	Marabá Paulista	4,573	919.5
Presidente Prudente	Presidente Epitácio-Presidente Venceslau	Piquerobi	3,264	482.8
Presidente Prudente	Presidente Epitácio-Presidente Venceslau	Presidente Epitácio	39,505	1,260
Presidente Prudente	Presidente Epitácio-Presidente Venceslau	Presidente Venceslau	35,201	755.2
Presidente Prudente	Presidente Prudente	Alfredo Marcondes	4,445	118.9
Presidente Prudente	Presidente Prudente	Álvares Machado	27,255	347.6
Presidente Prudente	Presidente Prudente	Anhumas	4,023	320.8
Presidente Prudente	Presidente Prudente	Caiabu	3,712	253.4
Presidente Prudente	Presidente Prudente	Emilianópolis	3,014	225.2
Presidente Prudente	Presidente Prudente	Estrela do Norte	2,703	265.0
Presidente Prudente	Presidente Prudente	Euclides da Cunha Paulista	7,924	573.9
Presidente Prudente	Presidente Prudente	Iepê	7,619	595.0
Presidente Prudente	Presidente Prudente	Indiana	5,090	129.4
Presidente Prudente	Presidente Prudente	João Ramalho	4,371	415.5
Presidente Prudente	Presidente Prudente	Martinópolis	24,881	1,254
Presidente Prudente	Presidente Prudente	Mirante do Paranapanema	15,917	1,239
Presidente Prudente	Presidente Prudente	Nantes	2,660	286.6
Presidente Prudente	Presidente Prudente	Narandiba	5,713	357.3
Presidente Prudente	Presidente Prudente	Pirapozinho	25,348	477.7
Presidente Prudente	Presidente Prudente	Presidente Bernardes	14,490	749.2
Presidente Prudente	Presidente Prudente	Presidente Prudente	225,668	560.6
Presidente Prudente	Presidente Prudente	Quatá	13,163	651.3
Presidente Prudente	Presidente Prudente	Rancharia	28,588	1,587
Presidente Prudente	Presidente Prudente	Regente Feijó	20,145	263.3
Presidente Prudente	Presidente Prudente	Ribeirão dos Índios	2,025	196.4
Presidente Prudente	Presidente Prudente	Rosana	17,440	744.0
Presidente Prudente	Presidente Prudente	Sandovalina	3,645	455.9
Presidente Prudente	Presidente Prudente	Santo Anastácio	17,963	552.9
Presidente Prudente	Presidente Prudente	Santo Expedito	3,000	94.47
Presidente Prudente	Presidente Prudente	Taciba	6,260	607.3
Presidente Prudente	Presidente Prudente	Tarabai	6,536	201.4
Presidente Prudente	Presidente Prudente	Teodoro Sampaio	22,173	1,556
Ribeirão Preto	Barretos	Barretos	122,485	1,566
Ribeirão Preto	Barretos	Bebedouro	76,373	683.2
Ribeirão Preto	Barretos	Cajobi	9,133	176.9
Ribeirão Preto	Barretos	Colina	18,486	422.3
Ribeirão Preto	Barretos	Colômbia	6,629	728.6
Ribeirão Preto	Barretos	Guaíra	39,279	1,258
Ribeirão Preto	Barretos	Guaraci	10,350	641.5
Ribeirão Preto	Barretos	Jaborandi	6,221	273.4
Ribeirão Preto	Barretos	Monte Azul Paulista	18,151	263.5
Ribeirão Preto	Barretos	Olímpia	55,074	802.6
Ribeirão Preto	Barretos	Severínia	14,576	140.5
Ribeirão Preto	Barretos	Taiaçu	5,677	107.1
Ribeirão Preto	Barretos	Taiúva	6,548	132.5
Ribeirão Preto	Barretos	Taquaral	2,619	53.89
Ribeirão Preto	Barretos	Terra Roxa	7,904	221.5
Ribeirão Preto	Barretos	Viradouro	17,414	217.7
Ribeirão Preto	Franca	Cristais Paulista	9,272	385.2
Ribeirão Preto	Franca	Franca	352,536	605.7
Ribeirão Preto	Franca	Itirapuã	5,779	161.1
Ribeirão Preto	Franca	Jeriquara	3,863	142.0
Ribeirão Preto	Franca	Patrocínio Paulista	14,512	602.8
Ribeirão Preto	Franca	Pedregulho	15,525	712.6
Ribeirão Preto	Franca	Restinga	6,404	245.7
Ribeirão Preto	Franca	Ribeirão Corrente	4,608	148.3
Ribeirão Preto	Franca	Rifaina	4,049	162.5
Ribeirão Preto	Franca	São José da Bela Vista	7,626	277.0
Ribeirão Preto	Ituverava	Aramina	5,420	202.8
Ribeirão Preto	Ituverava	Buritizal	4,356	266.4
Ribeirão Preto	Ituverava	Guará	18,606	362.2
Ribeirão Preto	Ituverava	Igarapava	26,212	468.4
Ribeirão Preto	Ituverava	Ituverava	37,571	704.7
Ribeirão Preto	Ituverava	Miguelópolis	19,441	820.8
Ribeirão Preto	Ribeirão Preto	Altinópolis	16,818	929.0
Ribeirão Preto	Ribeirão Preto	Barrinha	32,092	146.0
Ribeirão Preto	Ribeirão Preto	Batatais	58,402	849.5
Ribeirão Preto	Ribeirão Preto	Brodowski	25,201	278.5
Ribeirão Preto	Ribeirão Preto	Cajuru	23,830	660.1
Ribeirão Preto	Ribeirão Preto	Cássia dos Coqueiros	2,799	191.7
Ribeirão Preto	Ribeirão Preto	Cravinhos	33,281	311.4
Ribeirão Preto	Ribeirão Preto	Dumont	9,471	111.4
Ribeirão Preto	Ribeirão Preto	Guariba	37,498	270.3
Ribeirão Preto	Ribeirão Preto	Guatapará	7,320	413.6
Ribeirão Preto	Ribeirão Preto	Jaboticabal	71,821	706.6
Ribeirão Preto	Ribeirão Preto	Jardinópolis	45,282	501.9
Ribeirão Preto	Ribeirão Preto	Luís Antônio	12,265	598.3
Ribeirão Preto	Ribeirão Preto	Monte Alto	47,574	346.9
Ribeirão Preto	Ribeirão Preto	Pitangueiras	33,674	430.6
Ribeirão Preto	Ribeirão Preto	Pontal	37,607	356.4
Ribeirão Preto	Ribeirão Preto	Pradópolis	17,078	167.4
Ribeirão Preto	Ribeirão Preto	Ribeirão Preto	698,642	650.9
Ribeirão Preto	Ribeirão Preto	Santa Cruz da Esperança	2,116	148.1
Ribeirão Preto	Ribeirão Preto	Santa Ernestina	6,118	134.4
Ribeirão Preto	Ribeirão Preto	Santa Rosa de Viterbo	23,411	288.6
Ribeirão Preto	Ribeirão Preto	Santo Antônio da Alegria	6,775	310.3
Ribeirão Preto	Ribeirão Preto	São Simão	13,442	617.3
Ribeirão Preto	Ribeirão Preto	Serra Azul	12,746	283.1
Ribeirão Preto	Ribeirão Preto	Serrana	43,909	126.0
Ribeirão Preto	Ribeirão Preto	Sertãozinho	126,887	403.1
Ribeirão Preto	São Joaquim da Barra – Orlândia	Ipuã	14,454	466.5
Ribeirão Preto	São Joaquim da Barra – Orlândia	Morro Agudo	27,933	1,388
Ribeirão Preto	São Joaquim da Barra – Orlândia	Nuporanga	7,391	348.3
Ribeirão Preto	São Joaquim da Barra – Orlândia	Orlândia	38,319	291.8
Ribeirão Preto	São Joaquim da Barra – Orlândia	Sales Oliveira	11,411	305.8
Ribeirão Preto	São Joaquim da Barra – Orlândia	São Joaquim da Barra	48,558	410.9
São José do Rio Preto	Catanduva	Ariranha	7,602	132.6
São José do Rio Preto	Catanduva	Catanduva	115,791	290.6
São José do Rio Preto	Catanduva	Catiguá	7,003	148.4
São José do Rio Preto	Catanduva	Elisiário	3,138	93.98
São José do Rio Preto	Catanduva	Embaúba	2,323	83.13
São José do Rio Preto	Catanduva	Fernando Prestes	5,942	170.0
São José do Rio Preto	Catanduva	Itajobi	16,989	502.1
São José do Rio Preto	Catanduva	Marapoama	3,292	111.3
São José do Rio Preto	Catanduva	Novais	4,412	117.8
São José do Rio Preto	Catanduva	Palmares Paulista	9,650	82.13
São José do Rio Preto	Catanduva	Paraíso	6,099	155.2
São José do Rio Preto	Catanduva	Pindorama	14,542	184.8
São José do Rio Preto	Catanduva	Pirangi	10,885	215.8
São José do Rio Preto	Catanduva	Santa Adélia	14,018	330.3
São José do Rio Preto	Catanduva	Tabapuã	11,323	345.8
São José do Rio Preto	Catanduva	Vista Alegre do Alto	8,109	95.43
São José do Rio Preto	Fernandópolis	Estrela d'Oeste	9,417	296.3
São José do Rio Preto	Fernandópolis	Fernandópolis	71,186	549.8
São José do Rio Preto	Fernandópolis	Guarani d'Oeste	1,968	85.70
São José do Rio Preto	Fernandópolis	Indiaporã	4,035	279.6
São José do Rio Preto	Fernandópolis	Macedônia	3,963	327.6
São José do Rio Preto	Fernandópolis	Meridiano	4,572	228.2
São José do Rio Preto	Fernandópolis	Mira Estrela	3,126	216.8
São José do Rio Preto	Fernandópolis	Ouroeste	10,294	288.6
São José do Rio Preto	Fernandópolis	Pedranópolis	2,787	260.1
São José do Rio Preto	Fernandópolis	São João das Duas Pontes	2,580	129.5
São José do Rio Preto	Fernandópolis	São João de Iracema	1,846	178.4
São José do Rio Preto	Jales	Aparecida d'Oeste	4,086	179.0
São José do Rio Preto	Jales	Aspásia	1,842	69.37
São José do Rio Preto	Jales	Dirce Reis	1,620	88.13
São José do Rio Preto	Jales	Dolcinópolis	2,207	77.94
São José do Rio Preto	Jales	Jales	48,776	368.6
São José do Rio Preto	Jales	Marinópolis	1,860	77.83
São José do Rio Preto	Jales	Mesópolis	1,952	148.6
São José do Rio Preto	Jales	Palmeira d'Oeste	8,903	318.7
São José do Rio Preto	Jales	Paranapuã	4,031	140.4
São José do Rio Preto	Jales	Pontalinda	4,127	209.5
São José do Rio Preto	Jales	Populina	4,127	315.9
São José do Rio Preto	Jales	Santa Albertina	6,393	272.7
São José do Rio Preto	Jales	Santa Salete	1,645	79.19
São José do Rio Preto	Jales	São Francisco	2,602	75.58
São José do Rio Preto	Jales	Suzanápolis	3,408	330.6
São José do Rio Preto	Jales	Turmalina	1,669	147.8
São José do Rio Preto	Jales	Urânia	8,833	209.3
São José do Rio Preto	Jales	Vitória Brasil	1,794	49.83
São José do Rio Preto	Santa Fé do Sul	Nova Canaã Paulista	2,032	124.5
São José do Rio Preto	Santa Fé do Sul	Rubineia	3,833	242.9
São José do Rio Preto	Santa Fé do Sul	Santa Clara d'Oeste	2,598	183.5
São José do Rio Preto	Santa Fé do Sul	Santa Fé do Sul	34,794	206.5
São José do Rio Preto	Santa Fé do Sul	Santa Rita d'Oeste	2,733	209.8
São José do Rio Preto	Santa Fé do Sul	Santana da Ponte Pensa	1,670	129.9
São José do Rio Preto	Santa Fé do Sul	Três Fronteiras	6,804	151.6
São José do Rio Preto	São José do Rio Preto	Adolfo	4,351	211.1
São José do Rio Preto	São José do Rio Preto	Altair	3,451	313.0
São José do Rio Preto	São José do Rio Preto	Bady Bassitt	27,260	110.4
São José do Rio Preto	São José do Rio Preto	Bálsamo	9,596	149.9
São José do Rio Preto	São José do Rio Preto	Cedral	12,618	197.8
São José do Rio Preto	São José do Rio Preto	Guapiaçu	21,711	325.1
São José do Rio Preto	São José do Rio Preto	Ibirá	11,690	271.9
São José do Rio Preto	São José do Rio Preto	Icém	7,819	362.4
São José do Rio Preto	São José do Rio Preto	Ipiguá	6,761	136.0
São José do Rio Preto	São José do Rio Preto	Irapuã	6,867	257.6
São José do Rio Preto	São José do Rio Preto	Jaci	7,613	145.1
São José do Rio Preto	São José do Rio Preto	José Bonifácio	36,633	860.2
São José do Rio Preto	São José do Rio Preto	Macaubal	7,481	248.1
São José do Rio Preto	São José do Rio Preto	Mendonça	6,159	195.2
São José do Rio Preto	São José do Rio Preto	Mirassol	63,337	243.2
São José do Rio Preto	São José do Rio Preto	Mirassolândia	4,669	166.1
São José do Rio Preto	São José do Rio Preto	Monte Aprazível	22,280	495.6
São José do Rio Preto	São José do Rio Preto	Neves Paulista	9,699	219.1
São José do Rio Preto	São José do Rio Preto	Nipoã	4,750	137.6
São José do Rio Preto	São José do Rio Preto	Nova Aliança	6,693	217.5
São José do Rio Preto	São José do Rio Preto	Nova Granada	19,419	531.8
São José do Rio Preto	São José do Rio Preto	Novo Horizonte	38,324	931.7
São José do Rio Preto	São José do Rio Preto	Onda Verde	4,771	242.9
São José do Rio Preto	São José do Rio Preto	Orindiúva	6,024	247.4
São José do Rio Preto	São José do Rio Preto	Palestina	11,476	697.7
São José do Rio Preto	São José do Rio Preto	Paulo de Faria	7,400	738.0
São José do Rio Preto	São José do Rio Preto	Planalto	4,389	289.8
São José do Rio Preto	São José do Rio Preto	Poloni	5,592	135.1
São José do Rio Preto	São José do Rio Preto	Potirendaba	18,496	342.5
São José do Rio Preto	São José do Rio Preto	Sales	6,437	308.6
São José do Rio Preto	São José do Rio Preto	São José do Rio Preto	480,393	431.9
São José do Rio Preto	São José do Rio Preto	Tanabi	25,265	747.2
São José do Rio Preto	São José do Rio Preto	Ubarana	5,365	209.9
São José do Rio Preto	São José do Rio Preto	Uchoa	10,394	252.4
São José do Rio Preto	São José do Rio Preto	União Paulista	1,603	79.06
São José do Rio Preto	São José do Rio Preto	Urupês	13,744	323.9
São José do Rio Preto	Votuporanga	Álvares Florence	3,915	362.4
São José do Rio Preto	Votuporanga	Américo de Campos	5,870	252.9
São José do Rio Preto	Votuporanga	Cardoso	11,345	639.2
São José do Rio Preto	Votuporanga	Cosmorama	8,719	441.7
São José do Rio Preto	Votuporanga	Floreal	2,733	204.2
São José do Rio Preto	Votuporanga	Nhandeara	9,852	436.2
São José do Rio Preto	Votuporanga	Parisi	2,892	84.74
São José do Rio Preto	Votuporanga	Pontes Gestal	2,387	217.5
São José do Rio Preto	Votuporanga	Riolândia	10,309	631.9
São José do Rio Preto	Votuporanga	Sebastianópolis do Sul	3,130	167.8
São José do Rio Preto	Votuporanga	Valentim Gentil	14,098	149.7
São José do Rio Preto	Votuporanga	Votuporanga	96,634	420.7
São José dos Campos	Caraguatatuba - Ubatuba - São Sebastião	Caraguatatuba	134,873	484.9
São José dos Campos	Caraguatatuba - Ubatuba - São Sebastião	Ilhabela	34,934	346.4
São José dos Campos	Caraguatatuba - Ubatuba - São Sebastião	São Sebastião	81,595	402.4
São José dos Campos	Caraguatatuba - Ubatuba - São Sebastião	Ubatuba	92,981	708.1
São José dos Campos	Cruzeiro	Arapeí	2,330	156.9
São José dos Campos	Cruzeiro	Areias	3,577	305.2
São José dos Campos	Cruzeiro	Bananal	9,969	616.4
São José dos Campos	Cruzeiro	Cachoeira Paulista	31,564	288.0
São José dos Campos	Cruzeiro	Cruzeiro	74,961	305.7
São José dos Campos	Cruzeiro	Lavrinhas	7,171	167.1
São José dos Campos	Cruzeiro	Queluz	9,159	249.4
São José dos Campos	Cruzeiro	São José do Barreiro	3,853	570.7
São José dos Campos	Cruzeiro	Silveiras	6,186	414.8
São José dos Campos	Guaratinguetá	Aparecida	32,569	120.9
São José dos Campos	Guaratinguetá	Canas	4,931	53.26
São José dos Campos	Guaratinguetá	Cunha	22,110	1,407
São José dos Campos	Guaratinguetá	Guaratinguetá	118,044	752.6
São José dos Campos	Guaratinguetá	Lorena	84,855	414.2
São José dos Campos	Guaratinguetá	Piquete	12,490	176.0
São José dos Campos	Guaratinguetá	Potim	20,392	44.64
São José dos Campos	Guaratinguetá	Roseira	10,832	129.8
São José dos Campos	São José dos Campos	Caçapava	96,202	369.0
São José dos Campos	São José dos Campos	Igaratá	10,605	293.0
São José dos Campos	São José dos Campos	Jacareí	240,275	464.3
São José dos Campos	São José dos Campos	Jambeiro	6,397	184.4
São José dos Campos	São José dos Campos	Monteiro Lobato	4,138	332.7
São José dos Campos	São José dos Campos	Paraibuna	17,667	809.6
São José dos Campos	São José dos Campos	Santa Branca	13,975	272.2
São José dos Campos	São José dos Campos	São José dos Campos	697,054	1,099
São José dos Campos	Taubaté - Pindamonhangaba	Campos do Jordão	46,974	290.0
São José dos Campos	Taubaté - Pindamonhangaba	Lagoinha	5,083	255.5
São José dos Campos	Taubaté - Pindamonhangaba	Natividade da Serra	6,999	833.4
São José dos Campos	Taubaté - Pindamonhangaba	Pindamonhangaba	165,428	731.4
São José dos Campos	Taubaté - Pindamonhangaba	Redenção da Serra	4,494	309.4
São José dos Campos	Taubaté - Pindamonhangaba	Santo Antônio do Pinhal	7,133	133.0
São José dos Campos	Taubaté - Pindamonhangaba	São Bento do Sapucaí	11,674	252.6
São José dos Campos	Taubaté - Pindamonhangaba	São Luiz do Paraitinga	10,337	617.3
São José dos Campos	Taubaté - Pindamonhangaba	Taubaté	310,739	625.0
São José dos Campos	Taubaté - Pindamonhangaba	Tremembé	51,173	191.1
São Paulo	Santos	Bertioga	64,188	491.5
São Paulo	Santos	Cubatão	112,476	142.9
São Paulo	Santos	Guarujá	287,634	144.8
São Paulo	Santos	Itanhaém	112,476	601.7
São Paulo	Santos	Itariri	15,762	273.7
São Paulo	Santos	Mongaguá	61,951	142.8
São Paulo	Santos	Pedro de Toledo	11,281	670.4
São Paulo	Santos	Peruíbe	68,352	326.2
São Paulo	Santos	Praia Grande	349,935	149.7
São Paulo	Santos	Santos	418,608	281.0
São Paulo	Santos	São Vicente	329,911	148.2
São Paulo	São Paulo	Arujá	86,678	96.17
São Paulo	São Paulo	Barueri	316,473	65.70
São Paulo	São Paulo	Biritiba-Mirim	29,683	317.4
São Paulo	São Paulo	Caieiras	95,032	97.64
São Paulo	São Paulo	Cajamar	92,689	131.4
São Paulo	São Paulo	Carapicuíba	386,984	34.55
São Paulo	São Paulo	Cotia	274,413	324.0
São Paulo	São Paulo	Diadema	393,237	30.73
São Paulo	São Paulo	Embu das Artes	250,691	70.40
São Paulo	São Paulo	Embu-Guaçu	66,970	155.6
São Paulo	São Paulo	Ferraz de Vasconcelos	179,198	29.55
São Paulo	São Paulo	Francisco Morato	165,139	49.00
São Paulo	São Paulo	Franco da Rocha	144,849	132.8
São Paulo	São Paulo	Guararema	31,236	270.8
São Paulo	São Paulo	Guarulhos	1,291,771	318.7
São Paulo	São Paulo	Itapecerica da Serra	158,522	150.7
São Paulo	São Paulo	Itapevi	232,297	82.66
São Paulo	São Paulo	Itaquaquecetuba	369,275	82.62
São Paulo	São Paulo	Jandira	118,045	17.45
São Paulo	São Paulo	Juquitiba	27,404	522.2
São Paulo	São Paulo	Mairiporã	93,853	320.7
São Paulo	São Paulo	Mauá	418,261	61.94
São Paulo	São Paulo	Mogi das Cruzes	451,505	712.5
São Paulo	São Paulo	Osasco	728,615	64.95
São Paulo	São Paulo	Pirapora do Bom Jesus	18,370	108.5
São Paulo	São Paulo	Poá	103,765	17.26
São Paulo	São Paulo	Ribeirão Pires	115,559	98.97
São Paulo	São Paulo	Rio Grande da Serra	44,170	36.34
São Paulo	São Paulo	Salesópolis	15,202	425.0
São Paulo	São Paulo	Santa Isabel	53,174	363.3
São Paulo	São Paulo	Santana de Parnaíba	154,105	179.9
São Paulo	São Paulo	Santo André	748,919	175.8
São Paulo	São Paulo	São Bernardo do Campo	810,729	409.5
São Paulo	São Paulo	São Caetano do Sul	165,655	15.33
São Paulo	São Paulo	São Lourenço da Serra	16,067	186.5
São Paulo	São Paulo	São Paulo	11,451,999	1,521
São Paulo	São Paulo	Suzano	307,429	206.2
São Paulo	São Paulo	Taboão da Serra	273,542	20.39
São Paulo	São Paulo	Vargem Grande Paulista	50,415	42.49
Sorocaba	Avaré	Águas de Santa Bárbara	7,177	404.5
Sorocaba	Avaré	Arandu	6,885	285.9
Sorocaba	Avaré	Avaré	92,805	1,213
Sorocaba	Avaré	Cerqueira César	21,469	511.6
Sorocaba	Avaré	Coronel Macedo	4,280	303.8
Sorocaba	Avaré	Iaras	8,010	401.4
Sorocaba	Avaré	Itaí	25,180	1,093
Sorocaba	Avaré	Manduri	9,871	229.0
Sorocaba	Avaré	Óleo	2,512	198.9
Sorocaba	Avaré	Paranapanema	19,395	1,019
Sorocaba	Avaré	Taguaí	12,669	145.3
Sorocaba	Avaré	Taquarituba	24,350	448.5
Sorocaba	Itapetininga	Alambari	6,141	159.6
Sorocaba	Itapetininga	Angatuba	24,022	1,027
Sorocaba	Itapetininga	Campina do Monte Alegre	5,954	184.5
Sorocaba	Itapetininga	Guareí	15,013	567.9
Sorocaba	Itapetininga	Itapetininga	157,790	1,789
Sorocaba	Itapetininga	São Miguel Arcanjo	32,039	930.3
Sorocaba	Itapeva	Apiaí	24,585	974.3
Sorocaba	Itapeva	Barão de Antonina	3,618	153.1
Sorocaba	Itapeva	Barra do Chapéu	5,179	405.7
Sorocaba	Itapeva	Bom Sucesso de Itararé	3,555	133.6
Sorocaba	Itapeva	Buri	20,250	1,196
Sorocaba	Itapeva	Capão Bonito	46,337	1,640
Sorocaba	Itapeva	Guapiara	17,071	408.3
Sorocaba	Itapeva	Itaberá	17,983	1,100
Sorocaba	Itapeva	Itaoca	3,422	183.0
Sorocaba	Itapeva	Itapeva	89,728	1,826
Sorocaba	Itapeva	Itapirapuã Paulista	4,306	406.5
Sorocaba	Itapeva	Itaporanga	14,085	508.0
Sorocaba	Itapeva	Itararé	44,438	1,004
Sorocaba	Itapeva	Nova Campina	8,497	385.4
Sorocaba	Itapeva	Ribeira	3,132	335.8
Sorocaba	Itapeva	Ribeirão Branco	18,627	697.5
Sorocaba	Itapeva	Ribeirão Grande	7,450	333.4
Sorocaba	Itapeva	Riversul	5,599	385.9
Sorocaba	Itapeva	Taquarivaí	6,876	231.8
Sorocaba	Registro	Barra do Turvo	6,876	1,008
Sorocaba	Registro	Cajati	28,515	454.4
Sorocaba	Registro	Cananéia	12,289	1,237
Sorocaba	Registro	Eldorado	13,069	1,654
Sorocaba	Registro	Iguape	29,115	1,979
Sorocaba	Registro	Ilha Comprida	13,419	196.6
Sorocaba	Registro	Iporanga	4,046	1,152
Sorocaba	Registro	Jacupiranga	16,097	704.2
Sorocaba	Registro	Juquiá	17,154	812.8
Sorocaba	Registro	Miracatu	18,553	1,001
Sorocaba	Registro	Pariquera-Açu	19,233	359.4
Sorocaba	Registro	Registro	59,947	722.2
Sorocaba	Registro	Sete Barras	12,730	1,063
Sorocaba	Sorocaba	Alumínio	17,301	83.62
Sorocaba	Sorocaba	Araçariguama	21,522	145.2
Sorocaba	Sorocaba	Araçoiaba da Serra	32,443	255.3
Sorocaba	Sorocaba	Boituva	61,081	249.0
Sorocaba	Sorocaba	Capela do Alto	22,866	169.9
Sorocaba	Sorocaba	Cerquilho	44,695	127.8
Sorocaba	Sorocaba	Ibiúna	75,605	1,058
Sorocaba	Sorocaba	Iperó	36,459	170.3
Sorocaba	Sorocaba	Itu	168,240	640.7
Sorocaba	Sorocaba	Jumirim	3,056	56.69
Sorocaba	Sorocaba	Mairinque	50,027	210.1
Sorocaba	Sorocaba	Piedade	52,970	746.9
Sorocaba	Sorocaba	Pilar do Sul	27,619	681.2
Sorocaba	Sorocaba	Porto Feliz	56,497	556.7
Sorocaba	Sorocaba	Salto	134,319	133.1
Sorocaba	Sorocaba	Salto de Pirapora	45,138	280.4
Sorocaba	Sorocaba	São Roque	79,484	306.9
Sorocaba	Sorocaba	Sarapuí	10,369	352.6
Sorocaba	Sorocaba	Sorocaba	723,682	449.9
Sorocaba	Sorocaba	Tapiraí	7,996	755.1
Sorocaba	Sorocaba	Tietê	37,663	404.4
Sorocaba	Sorocaba	Votorantim	127,923	184.2
Sorocaba	Tatuí	Cesário Lange	19,048	190.4
Sorocaba	Tatuí	Pereiras	8,737	223.1
Sorocaba	Tatuí	Porangaba	10,451	265.7
Sorocaba	Tatuí	Quadra	3,405	205.7
Sorocaba	Tatuí	Tatuí	123,942	523.7
Sorocaba	Tatuí	Torre de Pedra	2,046	71.35

== See also ==
- Geography of Brazil
- List of cities in Brazil
- List of municipalities in São Paulo by HDI
