= Santa Cruz da Esperança =

- Municipality
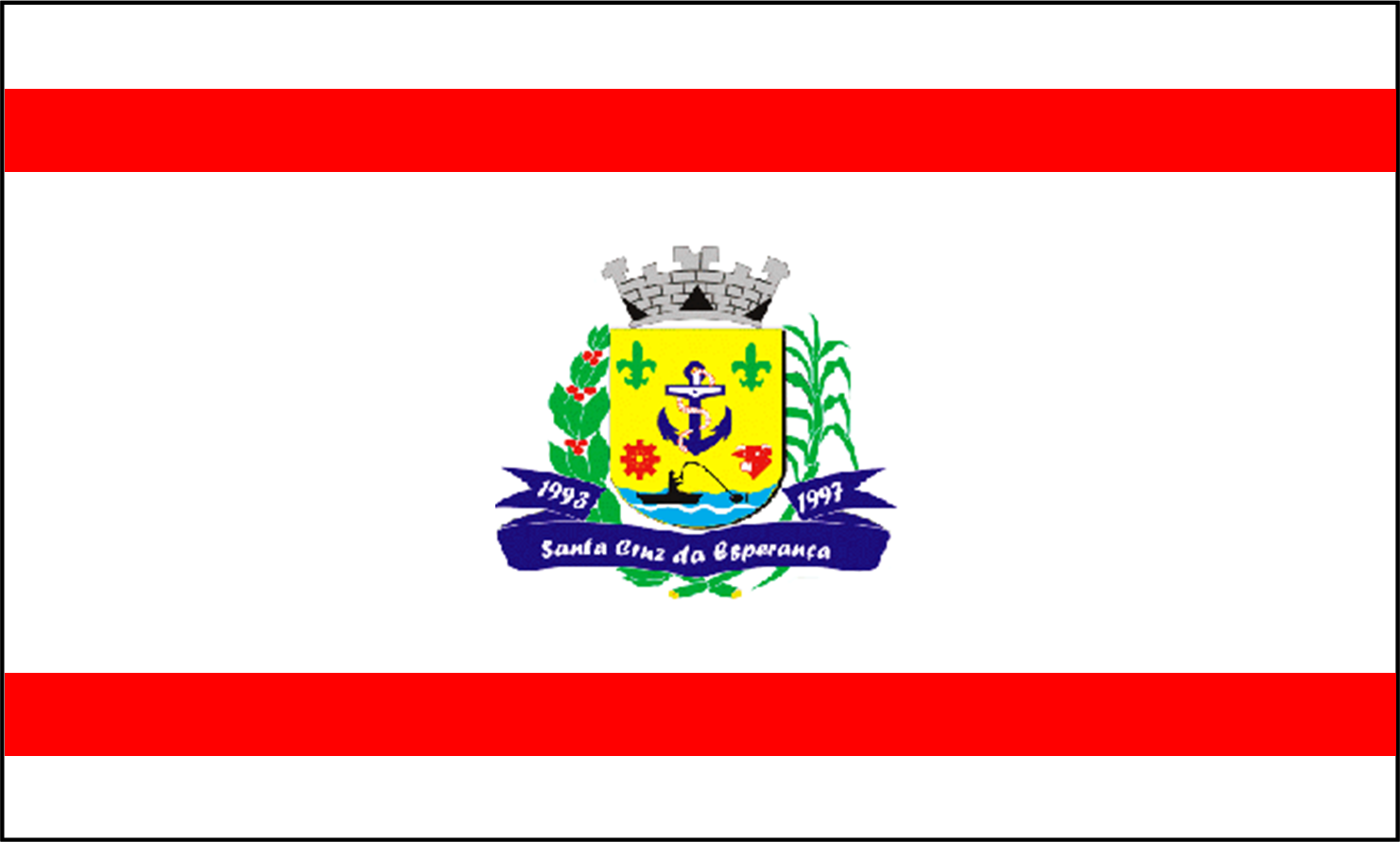
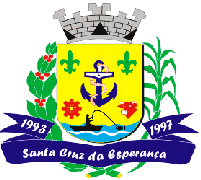
- Flag Coat of arms

- Location in São Paulo state

- Location in Brazil
- Coordinates: 21°17′27″S 47°25′47″W
- Country: Brazil
- Region: Southeast
- State: São Paulo

Government
  - Mayor: Dimar de Brito (PSDB)

Area
  - Total: 148 km^{2} (57 sq mi)

Population (2020)
  - Total: 2,153
  - Density: 14.5/km^{2} (37.7/sq mi)
- Time zone: UTC−3 (BRT)

Santa Cruz da Esperança is a municipality in the state of São Paulo in Brazil. The population is 2,153 (2020 est.) in an area of 148 km^{2} (57 sq mi). The elevation is 612 m.

== See also ==
- List of municipalities in São Paulo
- Interior of São Paulo
