= Buritizal =

Municipality in the state of São Paulo in Brazil

- Municipality
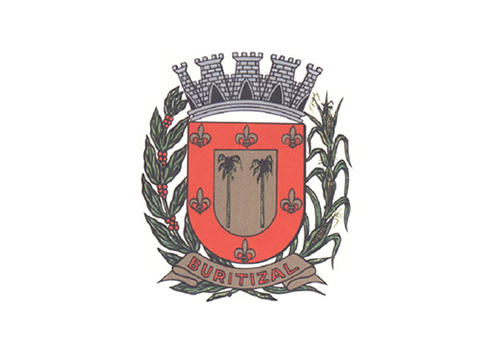
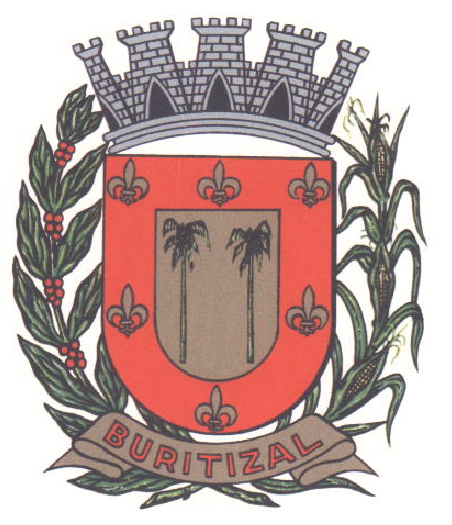
- Flag Coat of arms

- Location in São Paulo state

- Location in Brazil
- Coordinates: 20°11′28″S 47°42′30″W
- Country: Brazil
- Region: Southeast
- State: São Paulo

Area
  - Total: 266 km^{2} (103 sq mi)

Population (2020)
  - Total: 4,514
  - Density: 17.0/km^{2} (44.0/sq mi)
- Time zone: UTC−3 (BRT)

Buritizal is a municipality in the state of São Paulo in Brazil. The population is 4,514 (2020 est.) in an area of 266 km^{2}. The elevation is 855 m.

== Demographics ==
Historical population (municipality)
Year	Population	%±
1960	3,993	—
1970	5,569	39.5%
1980	3,868	−30.5%
1991	3,797	−1.8%
2000	3,674	−3.2%
2010	4,053	10.3%
2022	4,356	7.5%

== See also ==
- List of municipalities in São Paulo
