= Bofete =

Municipality in the state of São Paulo in Brazil

- Municipality
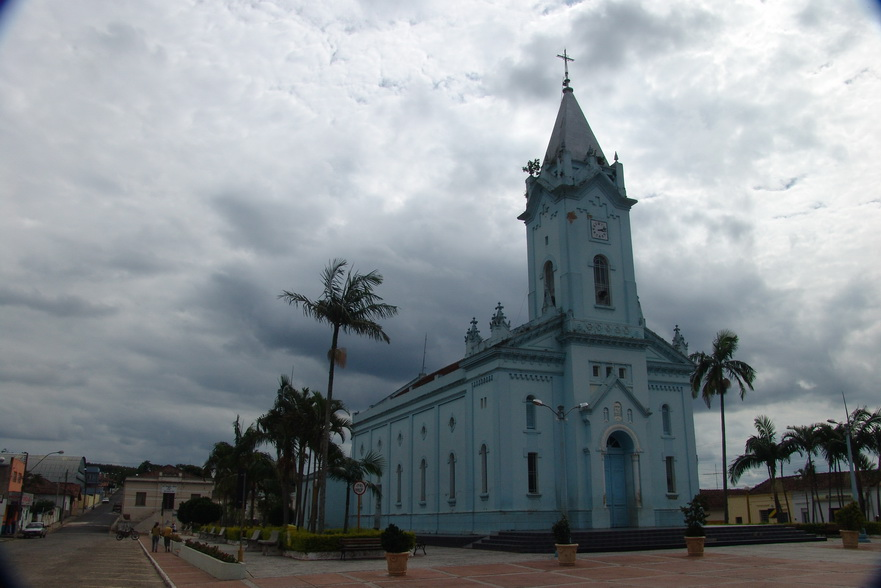

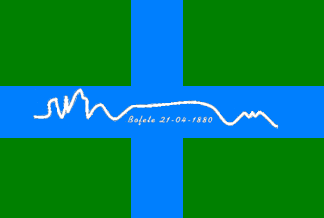
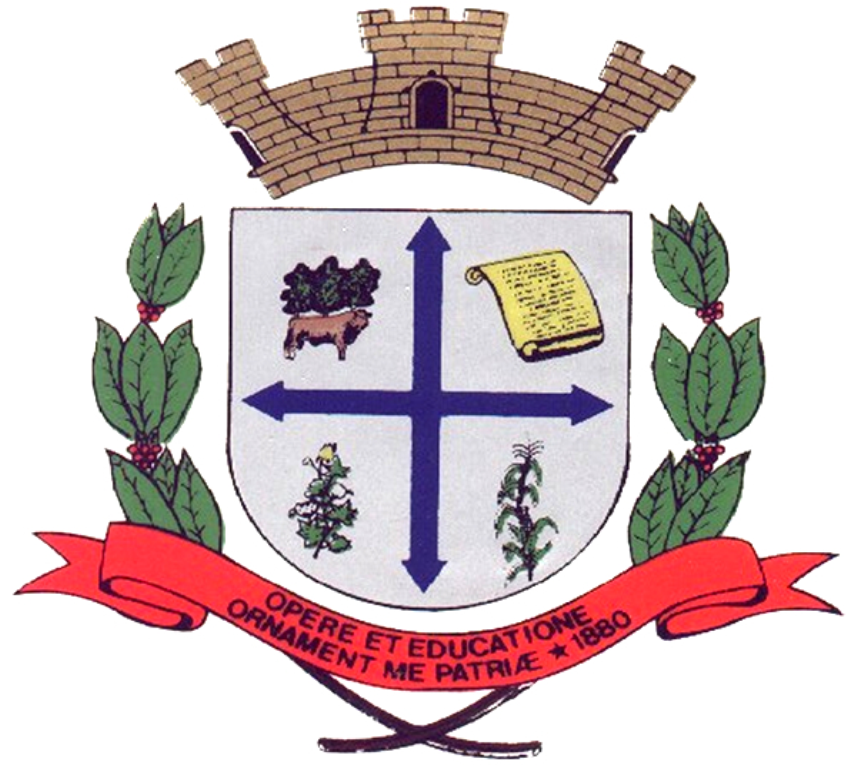
- Flag Coat of arms
- Nickname: "The Land of the Sleeping Giant"
- Motto: Opere et educatione ornament me patriæ (Work and education, ornament of my country)
- Location in São Paulo state

- Location in Brazil
- Coordinates: 23°6′8″S 48°15′28″W
- Country: Brazil
- Region: Southeast
- State: São Paulo

Area
  - Total: 654 km^{2} (253 sq mi)

Population (2020)
  - Total: 11,921
  - Density: 18.2/km^{2} (47.2/sq mi)
- Time zone: UTC−3 (BRT)

Bofete is a municipality in the state of São Paulo in Brazil. The population is 11,921 (2020 est.) in an area of 654 km^{2} (253 sq mi). The elevation is 576 m.

== Geography ==
With a mountainous relief and a mild subtropical highland climate, the city is known for its mountain known as "O Gigante Adormecido" (The Sleeping Giant).

== Demographics ==
Historical population (municipality)
Year	Population	%±
1920	10,443
1940	7,683	−26.4%
1950	6,039	−21.4%
1960	5,601	−7.3%
1970	5,327	−4.9%
1980	4,446	−16.5%
1991	5,666	27.4%
2000	7,356	29.8%
2010	9,618	30.8%
2022	10,460	8.8%

== Economy ==
The economy of the municipality is based on silviculture, orange cultivation, agriculture and tourism.

== Media ==
In telecommunications, the city was served by Telecomunicações de São Paulo. In July 1998, this company was acquired by Telefónica, which adopted the Vivo brand in 2012. The company is currently an operator of cell phones, fixed lines, internet (fiber optics/4G) and television (satellite and cable).

== Gallery ==
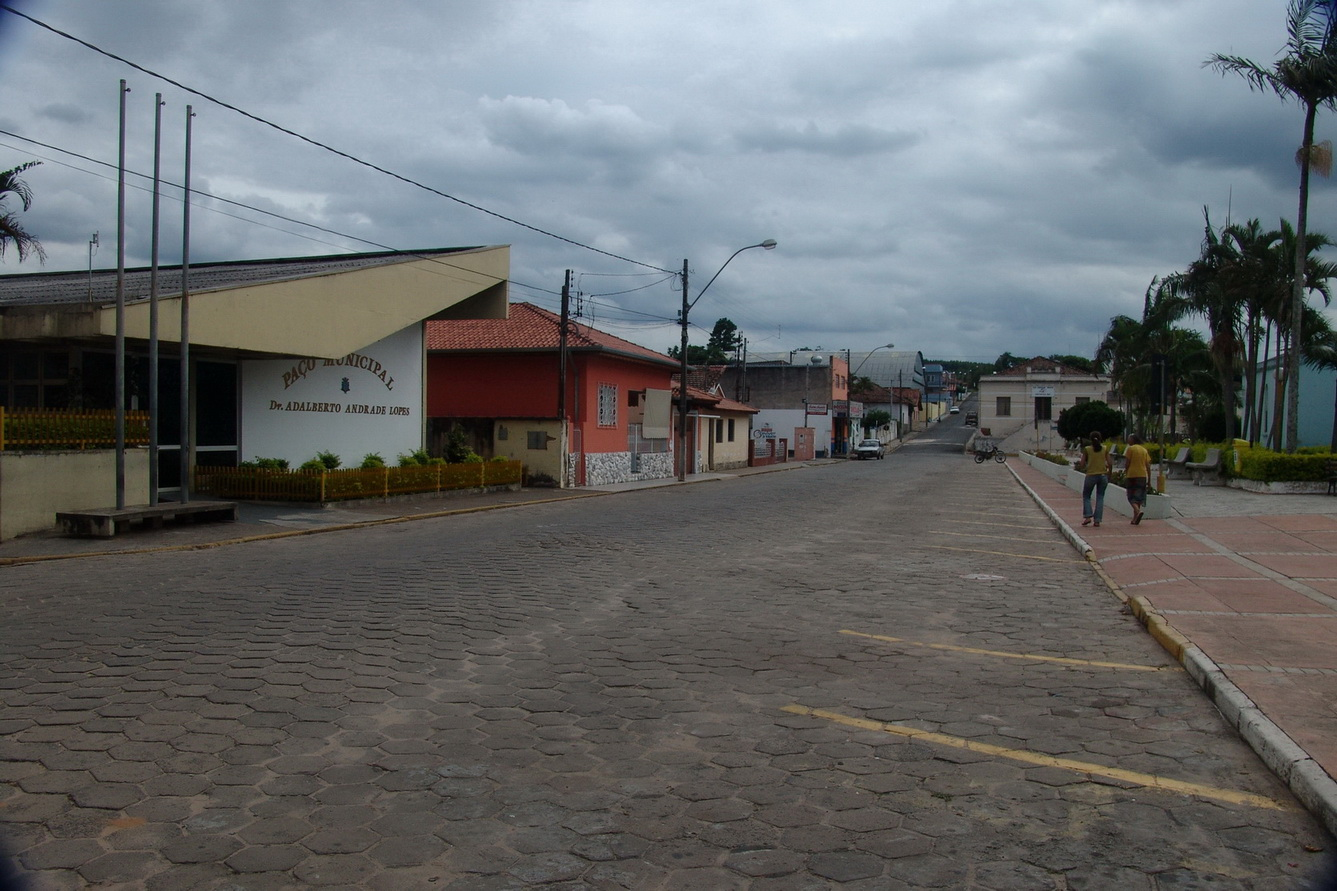

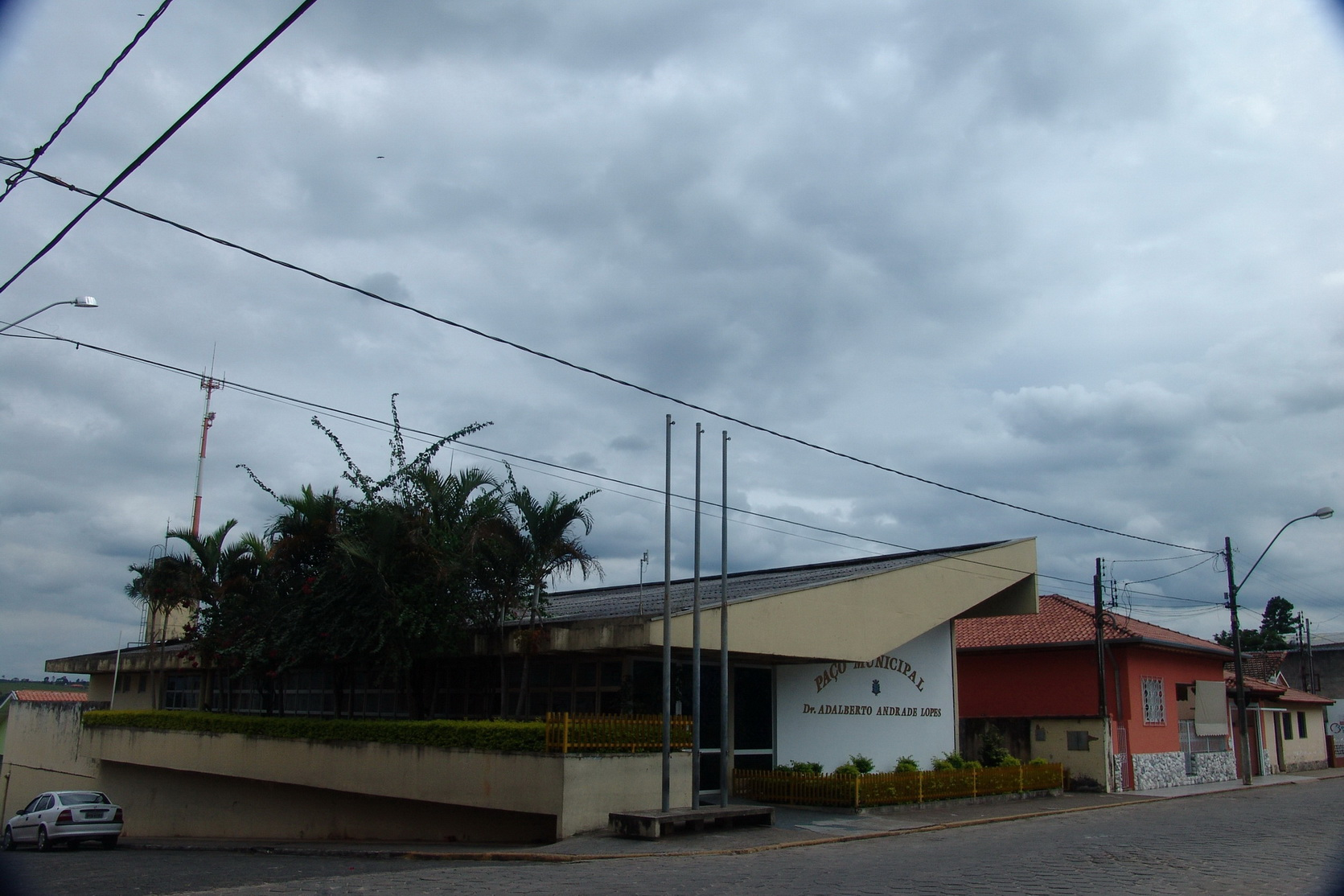

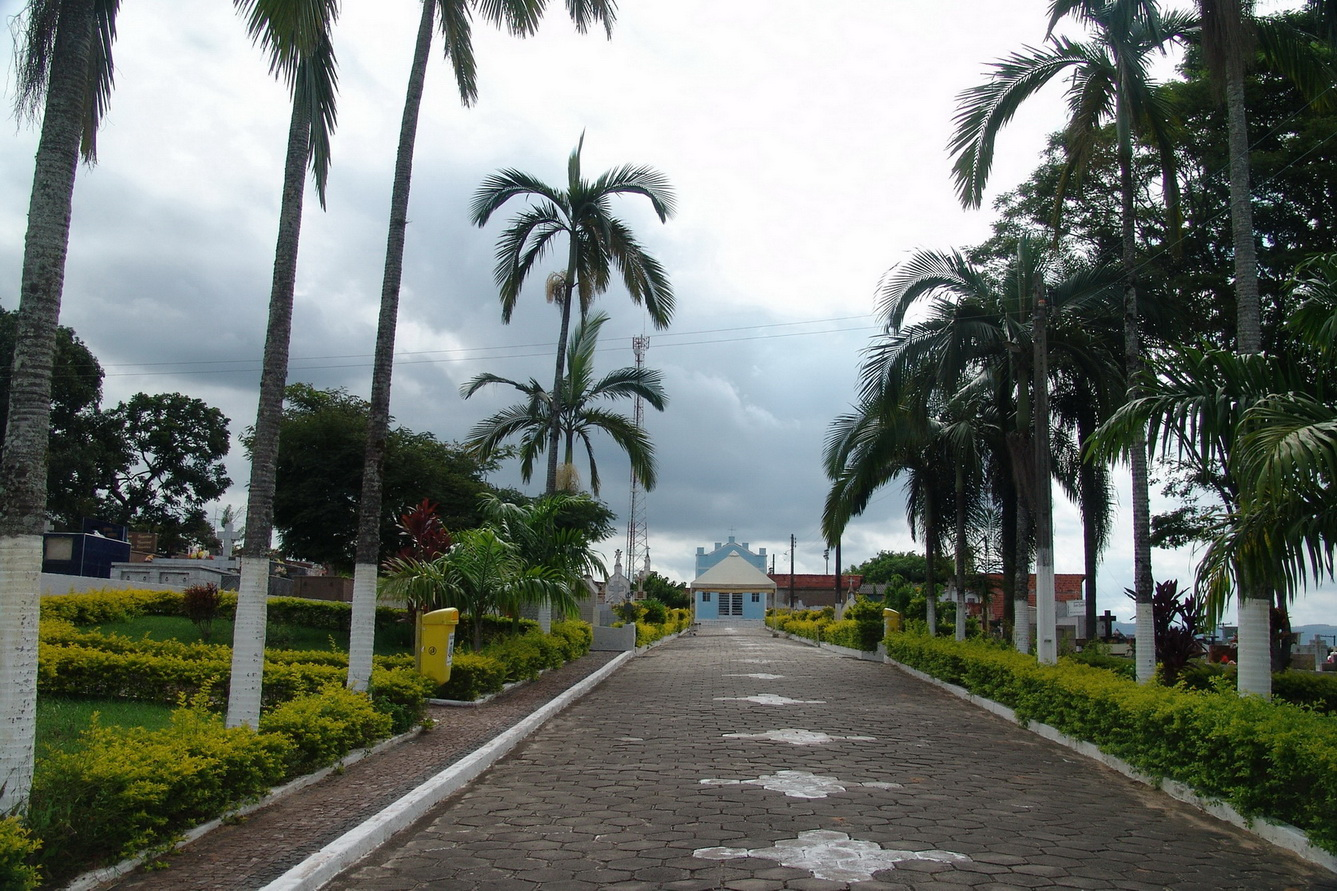

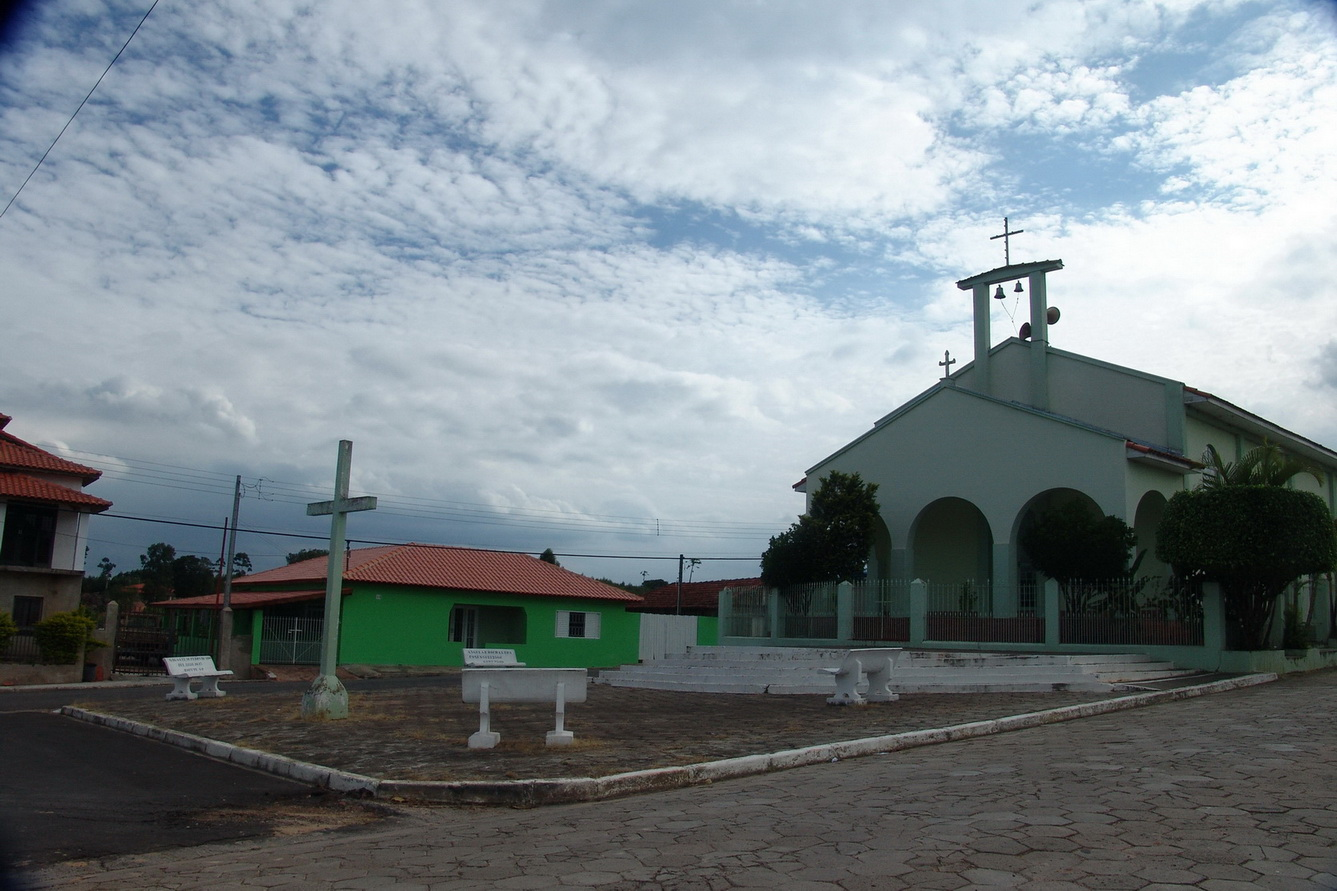

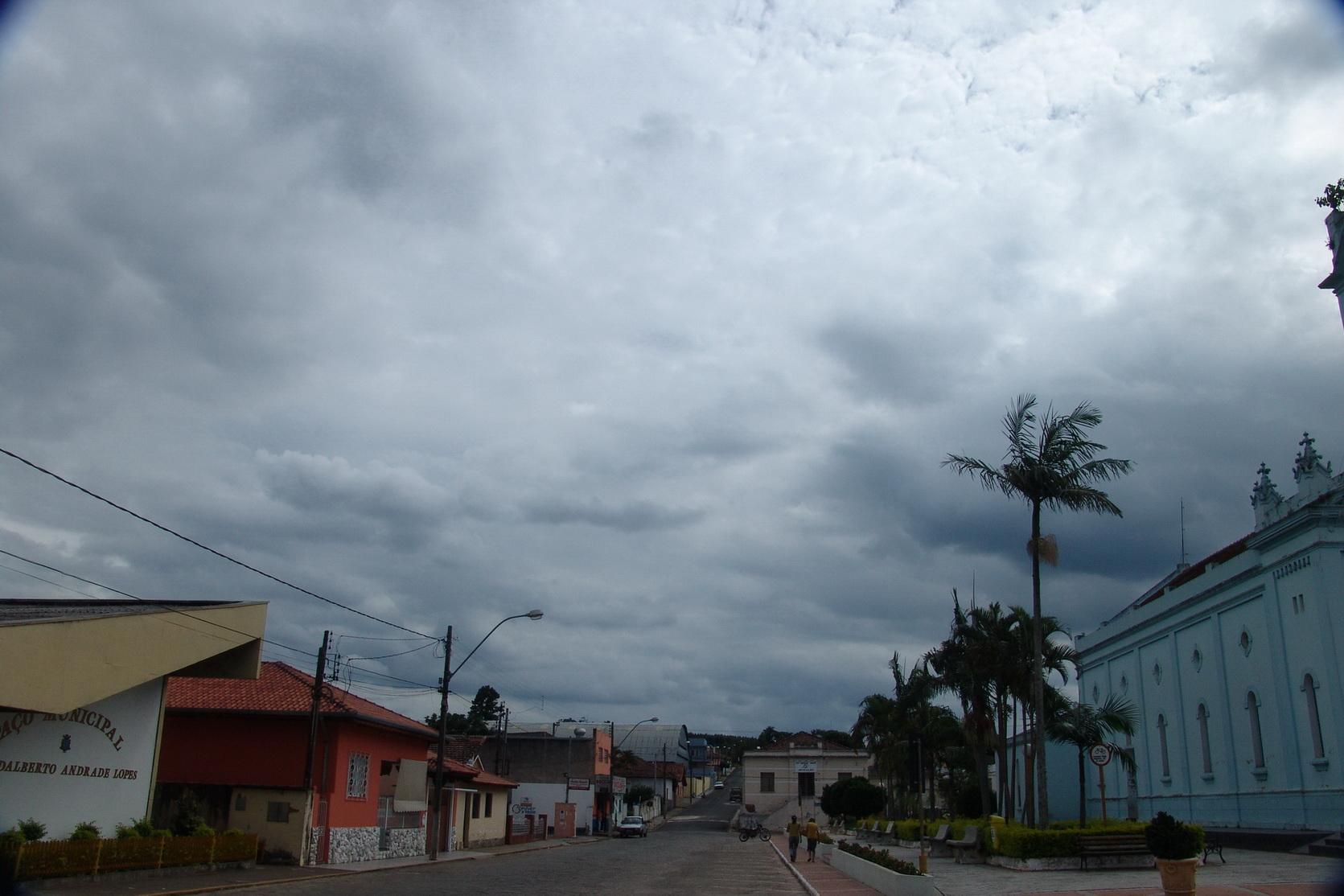

== See also ==
- List of municipalities in São Paulo
