= Murutinga do Sul =

- Municipality
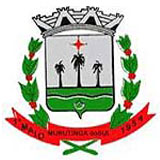
- Flag Coat of arms

- Location in São Paulo state

- Location in Brazil
- Coordinates: 20°59′26″S 51°16′29″W
- Country: Brazil
- Region: Southeast
- State: São Paulo

Area
  - Total: 251 km^{2} (97 sq mi)

Population (2020)
  - Total: 4,506
  - Density: 18.0/km^{2} (46.5/sq mi)
- Time zone: UTC−3 (BRT)

Murutinga do Sul is a municipality in the state of São Paulo in Brazil. The population is 4,506 (2020 est.) in an area of 251 km^{2}. The elevation is 409 m.

== Media ==
In telecommunications, the city was served by Companhia de Telecomunicações do Estado de São Paulo until 1975, when it began to be served by Telecomunicações de São Paulo. In July 1998, this company was acquired by Telefónica, which adopted the Vivo brand in 2012.

The company is currently an operator of cell phones, fixed lines, internet (fiber optics/4G) and television (satellite and cable).

== Name ==
The name Murutinga do Sul is derived from the Tupi language, one of the indigenous languages of Brazil. The word “Murutinga” roughly means “very white” or “very light”, likely referring to the color of the soil or local vegetation in the area. The phrase “do Sul”, meaning “of the South” in Portuguese, was added to distinguish the town from another location with the same name in northern Brazil and to indicate its geographical position in the southern part of the state of São Paulo.

== See also ==
- List of municipalities in São Paulo
- Interior of São Paulo
