= Maria Helena de Moura Neves =

Brazilian linguist (1931–2022)

- Born: 31 January 1931; Taiaçu, São Paulo
- Died: 17 December 2022 (aged 91); Araraquara, São Paulo
- Education: University of São Paulo
- Occupation: Linguist
- Awards: Ester Sabino Award (2022)

Maria Helena de Moura Neves (31 January 1931 – 17 December 2022) was a Brazilian linguist known for her work on language use, especially functional approaches to Portuguese grammar. She also conducted research on the history and teaching of grammar. She was professor emerita at São Paulo State University, and also lectured at Mackenzie Presbyterian University. In 2022 she received the Ester Sabino Award in the Senior Researcher category.

Moura Neves died of a stroke in Araraquara, São Paulo, on 17 December 2022, at the age of 91.

== Selected works ==
- A vertente grega da gramática tradicional (1987)
- Gramática na escola (1990)
- A gramática funcional (1997)
- Gramática de usos do português (2000)
- A gramática: história, teoria e análise, ensino (2002)
- Que gramática estudar na escola? Norma e uso na Língua Portuguesa (2003)
- Texto e Gramática (2006)
- A gramática do português revelada em textos (2018)
