= TV Vanguarda Taubaté =

- Taubaté, São Paulo; Brazil
- Channels: Digital: 28 (UHF); Virtual: 3
- Branding: Vanguarda

Programming
- Affiliations: TV Globo

Ownership
- Owner: Rede Vanguarda; (TV Taubaté Ltda.)

History
- Founded: June 7, 2001
- First air date: August 21, 2003
- Former channel numbers: Analog: 3 (VHF, 2003–2011)

Technical information
- Licensing authority: ANATEL
- ERP: 2 kW
- Transmitter coordinates: 23°2′10.18″S 45°32′45.5″W

Links
- Public license information: Profile
- Website: redeglobo.globo.com/sp/tvvanguarda

Vanguarda (channel 3) is a Brazilian television station based in Taubaté, a city in the state of São Paulo serving as the affiliate of the TV Globo network for said city and its surroundings. Together with TV Vanguarda São José dos Campos, it airs its programming to half of the Paraíba Valley, as well as the state's north coast. Its news offices and commercial department are located on the 1st floor of The One Office Tower building, in Bosque Flamboyant, and its transmitters are in Alto de São Pedro.

== History ==
The license for VHF channel 3 in Taubaté was granted, after public competition, by president Fernando Henrique Cardoso on June 7, 2001, for a company led by José Bonifácio de Oliveira Sobrinho, Boni, former director-general of Rede Globo. In March 2002, owing to financial problems related to unsuccessful investments at its subsidiary Globo Cabo, Globo sold its shares in 27 of its affiliates around the country, among them, TV Vanguarda of São José dos Campos, which was acquired by Boni in September that year.

With the union of the two stations, Rede Vanguarda was formed on August 21, 2003, with a combined coverage area of 40 municipalities on two stations. The Taubaté station opened that same day, only relaying the programming from the main station in São José dos Campos, and on September 20, it inaugurated its headquarters in Alto de São Pedro, in a public event which featured the presence of the governor of São Paulo, Geraldo Alckmin, and of the minister of communications, Miro Teixeira. In addition to VHF channel 3, the station also operated with a mirror on UHF channel 47, which, like the main channel, remained on air until the analog switch-off in 2018.

In 2019, TV Vanguarda Taubaté inaugurated its new facilities on the first floor of the business building The One Office Tower, in Bosque Flamboyant. There, the company's news division and commercial departments started operating, leaving only its equipments at the old headquarters, in Alto de São Pedro.

== Technical information ==
Subchannels of TV Vanguarda Taubaté
Virtual	Res.	Content
3.1	1080i	Rede Vanguarda

The station started its digital broadcasts in May 2010, in an experimental phase, on UHF channel 28 (using virtual channel 47). On June 1, alongside TV Vanguarda São José dos Campos, it officially inaugurated its digital broadcasts. In 2014, it started broadcasting in high definition. On May 7, 2018, the station changed its major virtual channel from 47 to 3.

Based on the federal decree for the transition of Brazilian TV stations from analog to digital signals, TV Vanguarda Taubaté, as well as the other stations in Taubaté, ceased broadcasting on VHF channel 3 and UHF channel 47 on January 17, 2018, following the official ANATEL schedule.

== Programming ==
Currently, all of its local news programs are relayed from the São José dos Campos station, while these bulletins have segments produced from the Taubaté studios with local reporters. In addition to generating its own advertising, the station also airs the Vanguarda Serviço bulletin during breaks. TV Vanguarda Taubaté fills its overnight slot with local news programs, in order to comply with the 5% minimum law for news programming, pre-empting Sessão Comédia na Madruga on weekdays, do Corujão on Saturdays and Cinemaço on Sundays. The slot is filled with editions of Vanguarda News and repeats of other productions, seen only in its coverage area.

== Relay stations ==
List of relay stations

City	Channel	City	Channel	City	Channel	City	Channel	City	Channel	City	Channel
Arapeí	02 (17)	Areias	04 (17)	Bananal	04 (17)	Cachoeira Paulista	03 (28)	Cruzeiro	03 (28)	Cunha	02 (28)
Guaratinguetá	03 (28)	Lagoinha	07 (28)	Lavrinhas	11 (17)	Natividade da Serra	05 (28)	Pindamonhangaba	03 (28)	Piquete	03 (17)
Queluz	02 (28)	Redenção da Serra	19 (17)	São José do Barreiro	09 (17)	São Luiz do Paraitinga	03 (28)	São Sebastião	58 (17)	Silveiras	06 (17)
Ubatuba	58 (17)
