= Jacareí =

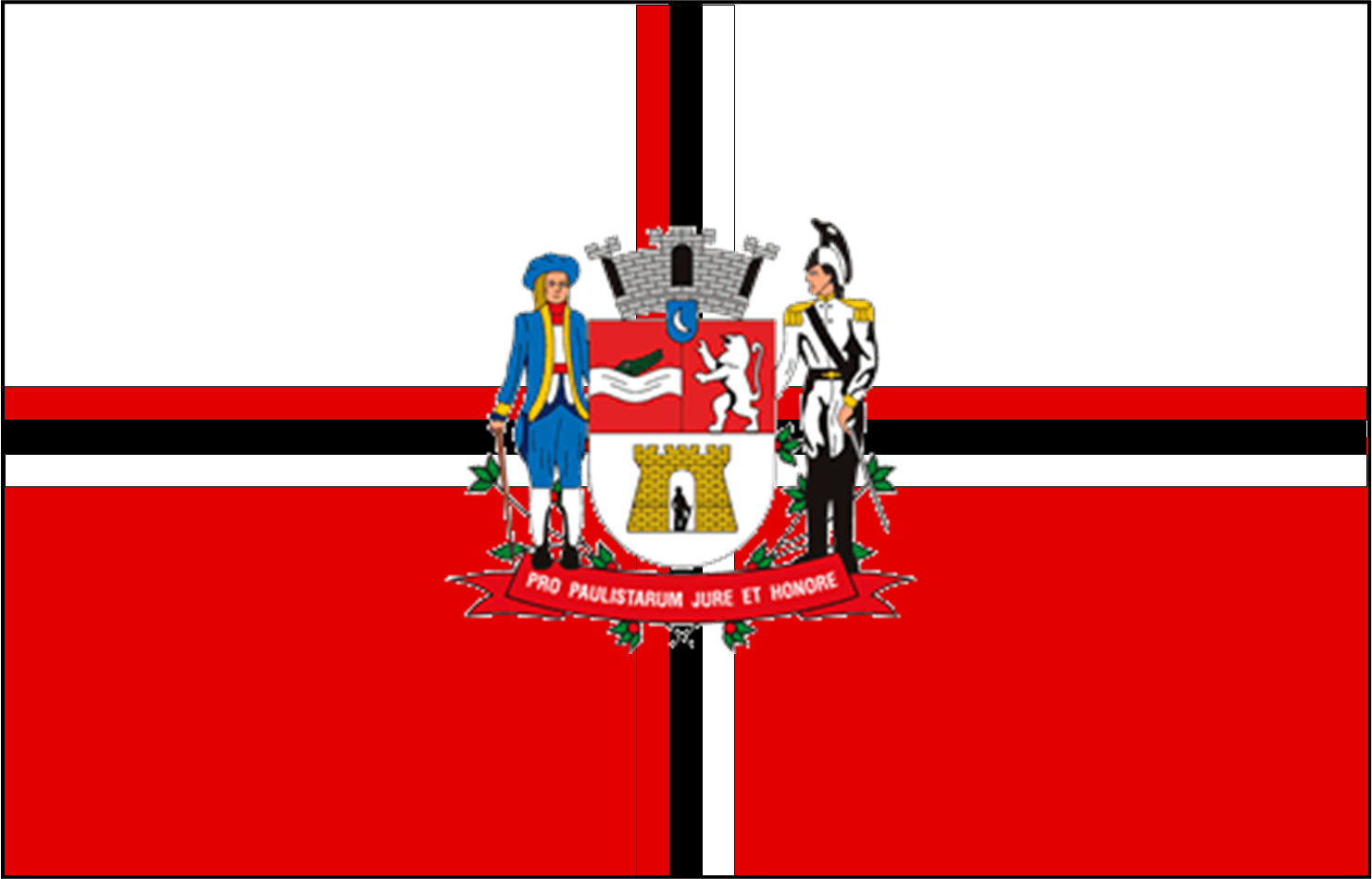
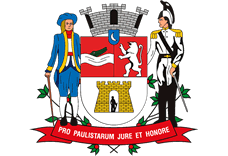
- Flag Coat of arms
- Nickname: Capital of Beer
- Location in São Paulo state

- Location within Brazil
- Coordinates: 23°18′19″S 45°57′57″W
- Country: Brazil
- Region: Southeast Brazil
- State: São Paulo
- Metropolitan Region: Vale do Paraíba e Litoral Norte
- Founded: 1652

Area
  - Total: 464.27 km^{2} (179.26 sq mi)
- Elevation: 567 m (1,860 ft)

Population (2022 Brazilian census)
  - Total: 240,275
  - Estimate (2025): 250,952
  - Density: 517.53/km^{2} (1,340.4/sq mi)
- Time zone: UTC-3 (BRT)
  - Summer (DST): UTC-2 (BRST)
- Postal Code: 12300-000
- Area code: +55 12
- Website: www.jacarei.sp.gov.br

Jacareí (Portuguese pronunciation: [ʒakaɾeˈi]) is a city in the state of São Paulo, Brazil. The population is 250,952 (2025 est.) in an area of 464.27 km^{2}. The city is known as "Capital of Beer" by the daily output of its factories, considered the biggest in Latin America. The economic activity is mainly based on industrial production. The industries produce mainly paper, chemicals, glass, wire, and rubber.

Its neighboring municipalities are: São José dos Campos to the north and northeast; Jambeiro to the east; Santa Branca to the southeast; Guararema to the southwest; Santa Isabel to the west and Igaratá to the northwest.

== Geography ==
=== Location ===
Jacareí is part of the Metropolitan Region of Vale do Paraíba e Litoral Norte. The city is located in the Paraíba do Sul's valley (the Paraíba do Sul is the most important river in the east of the state). This region is highly industrialized, located between the cities of São Paulo and Rio de Janeiro.

The municipality contains part of the 292,000-hectare (720,000-acre) Mananciais do Rio Paraíba do Sul Environmental Protection Area, created in 1982 to protect the sources of the Paraíba do Sul river.

Neighboring cities include São José dos Campos, Santa Branca, Guararema, Jambeiro, Igaratá, and Santa Isabel.

== History ==
Jacareí was formed on land that belonged to Mogi das Cruzes. It was founded by Antonio Afonso and his sons in 1652. They built a chapel in honor of Our Lady of Conception. With the help of peaceful Indians, the village prospered. In 1653, was elevated as a town and in 1849, as a city. Paraibuna (on December 7, 1812), Santa Branca (on February 20, 1841) and São José dos Campos (unknown date) were incorporated into the municipality of Jacareí. They were later dismembered: Sao José do Campos in 1767, Paraibuna in 1832 and Santa Branca in 1856. With the coffee cycle, the city begins to have paving, new roads and leisure activities, with a small population growth. It was one of the most important cities of the coffee cycle. At this time (late nineteenth century), industries were beginning to emerge, starting with the socks and the factory "Biscoutos Jacareí" (Jacareí's cookies), taking a leap of development in the twentieth century.

== Etymology ==
The origin of the name Jacareí is not known but there are two hypotheses.

Contains in the archives of the municipality that, in the past, the lakes and the Paraiba do Sul river relied on large numbers of alligators. In a fraternization, held on the river bank near the pond, a component of the group who was having fun next to the river, watching the large number of alligators made an observation: "Jacaré, iih" (alligator, iih). It was the simple interjection that, connected to the alligator, resulted in Jacareí.

The second hypothesis is that the word came from a native Brazilian language (Tupi language) "Icare-ig" that means "river of alligators".

== Demography ==
Census of 2009

Total Population: 212,824

Urban: 183,377 Rural: 7,914 Men: 94 634 Women: 96,657 Population density (inhabitants / Km ²): 415.85

Infant mortality up to 1 year (per thousand): 16.67

Life expectancy (years): 70.80

Fertility rate (children per woman): 2.19

Literacy rate: 93.97%

Human Development Index (HDI): 0.809 Income HDI: 0.752 Longevity HDI: 0.763 Education HDI: 0.913

Authorship: IPEADATA

== Media ==
In telecommunications, the city was served by Telecomunicações de São Paulo. In July 1998, this company was acquired by Telefónica, which adopted the Vivo brand in 2012. The company is currently an operator of cell phones, fixed lines, internet (fiber optics/4G) and television (satellite and cable).

Jacareí is the headquarters of the Novo Tempo Communication Network or RNTC, a media conglomerate owned by the Seventh-day Adventist Church World Organization. The city is home to Novo Tempo TV, Novo Tempo Recording Company and Novo Tempo Radio. The studios are located on the banks of the SP-66 highway, on the Henrique Eroles Highway. The network serves all Adventist broadcasters in South America, in Portuguese and also in Spanish.

=== Television ===
- TV Câmara Jacareí

== Sister Cities ==
- Cluj-Napoca, Romania
- Kawagoe, Japan

== See also ==
- List of municipalities in São Paulo
