= Caraguatatuba =

Municipality in the state of São Paulo in Brazil

- Municipality
- Municipality of Caraguatatuba
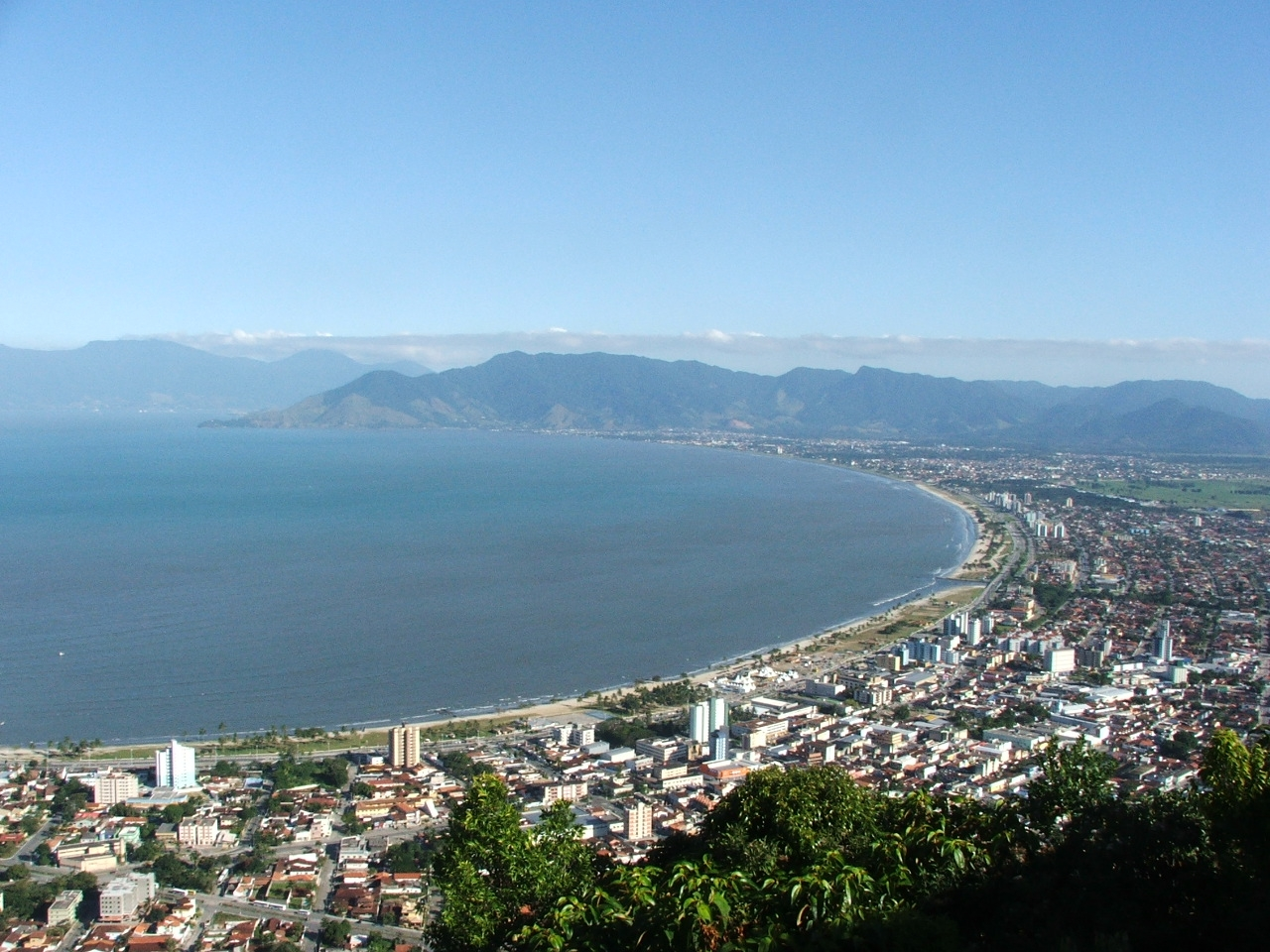

- Flag Coat of arms
- Nickname: "Capital do Litoral Norte" "Caraguá"
- Motto: Duc in altvm "Conduza para o Alto"
- Location in the state of São Paulo and Brazil

- Location in Brazil
- Coordinates: 23°37′12″S 45°24′46″W
- Country: Brazil
- Region: Southeast
- State: São Paulo
- Metropolitan Region: Vale do Paraíba e Litoral Norte
- Founded: April 20, 1857

Government
  - Mayor: Mateus Veneziani da Silva (PSDB)

Area
  - Total: 484.947 km^{2} (187.239 sq mi)
- Elevation: 2 m (6.6 ft)

Population (2022 Census)
  - Total: 134,873
  - Estimate (2025): 142,248
  - Density: 278.119/km^{2} (720.325/sq mi)
- Time zone: UTC−3 (BRT)
- HDI (2010): 0.759 – high
- Website: www.caraguatatuba.sp.gov.br

Caraguatatuba, widely known by its abbreviation Caraguá, is a city in the eastern part of the southern state of São Paulo in Brazil. It is part of the Metropolitan Region of Vale do Paraíba e Litoral Norte. The population is 123,389 (2020 est.) in an area of 485.10 km^{2}. Caraguatatuba is the largest city of São Paulo's north shore. The economy of the Caraguatatuba is driven by agriculture and tourism. The urban area and farmlands are within the coastline and valley areas, the majority of the northern part are heavily forested and rarely serves any roads to that area. The postal boundary dividing the 00000s and the 10000s lies to the southwestern boundary with Salesópolis.

== Population ==
| Year | Population |
|---|---|
| 2003 | 86,944 |
| 2004 | 92,283 |
| 2009 | 96,125 |
| 2010 | 100,899 |
| 2015 | 113,317 |
| 2022 | 134,873 |

== Geography ==
Caraguatatuba is located between the Atlantic Ocean and the Serra do Mar and is home to the Parque Estadual da Serra do Mar. Its neighboring cities are Natividade da Serra to the north, Ubatuba to the northeast, the Atlantic Ocean to the southeast (with the island of Ilhabela to the south), São Sebastião to the south, Salesópolis to the west and Paraibuna northwest.

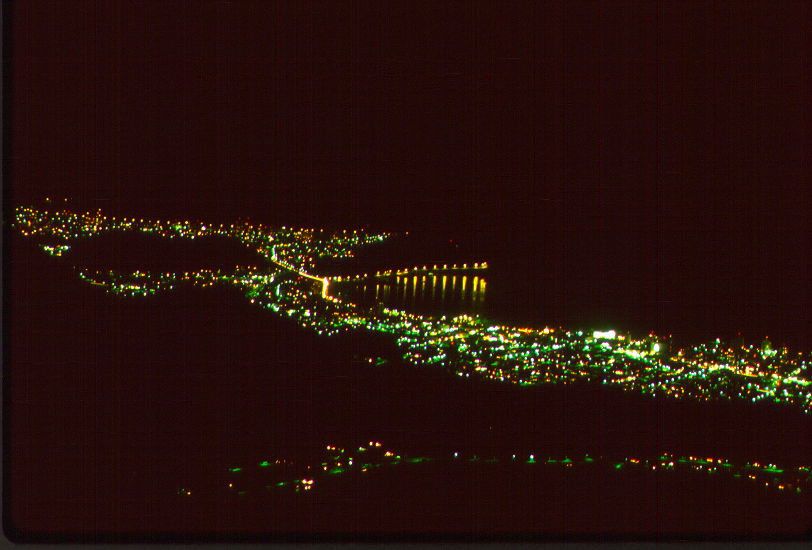
Approaching Caraguatatuba at night on the Rodovia dos Tamoios, 1994.

=== Beaches ===
There are 17 beaches in Caraguatatuba from north to south, they are:

- Praia de Tabatinga (Tabatinga Beach)
- Praia da Mocóca (Mococa Beach)
- Praia da Cocanha (Cocanha Beach)
- Praia do Massaguaçú (Massaguaçú Beach)
- Praia do Capricórnio (Capricorn Beach)
- Praia Brava (Brave Beach)
- Praia Martim de Sá (Martim de Sá Beach)
- Prainha (Little Beach)
- Praia da Freira (Nun Beach)
- Praia do Camaroeiro (Shrimping Beach)
- Praia do Centro (Downtown Beach)
- Praia Grande (Big Beach)
- Praia do Indaiá (Indaiá Beach)
- Praia Pan Brasil (Pan Brasil Beach)
- Praia das Palmeiras (Palm Trees Beach)
- Praia do Romance (Romance Beach)
- Praia das Flecheiras (Flecheiras Beach)
- Praia do Porto Novo (New Port Beach)

=== Climate ===
Climate data for Caraguatatuba (2007–2020 normals, extremes 2006–2015)
| Month | Jan | Feb | Mar | Apr | May | Jun | Jul | Aug | Sep | Oct | Nov | Dec | Year |
|---|---|---|---|---|---|---|---|---|---|---|---|---|---|
| Record high °C (°F) | 39.6 (103.3) | 38.0 (100.4) | 36.7 (98.1) | 35.0 (95.0) | 34.9 (94.8) | 34.1 (93.4) | 34.8 (94.6) | 37.8 (100.0) | 39.3 (102.7) | 34.1 (93.4) | 38.0 (100.4) | 38.5 (101.3) | 39.6 (103.3) |
| Mean daily maximum °C (°F) | 32.3 (90.1) | 32.7 (90.9) | 28.2 (82.8) | 26.4 (79.5) | 23.9 (75.0) | 23.9 (75.0) | 24.0 (75.2) | 23.6 (74.5) | 24.2 (75.6) | 25.0 (77.0) | 26.8 (80.2) | 30.0 (86.0) | 26.8 (80.2) |
| Daily mean °C (°F) | 27.5 (81.5) | 28.3 (82.9) | 26.2 (79.2) | 23.7 (74.7) | 20.9 (69.6) | 18.6 (65.5) | 18.7 (65.7) | 18.8 (65.8) | 20.2 (68.4) | 21.6 (70.9) | 23.6 (74.5) | 26.3 (79.3) | 22.9 (73.2) |
| Mean daily minimum °C (°F) | 23.0 (73.4) | 23.4 (74.1) | 20.6 (69.1) | 18.8 (65.8) | 17.6 (63.7) | 15.4 (59.7) | 14.5 (58.1) | 14.0 (57.2) | 16.1 (61.0) | 18.2 (64.8) | 19.3 (66.7) | 20.5 (68.9) | 18.5 (65.2) |
| Record low °C (°F) | 15.7 (60.3) | 16.6 (61.9) | 16.1 (61.0) | 11.4 (52.5) | 10.0 (50.0) | 6.4 (43.5) | 6.7 (44.1) | 5.6 (42.1) | 7.1 (44.8) | 11.4 (52.5) | 10.8 (51.4) | 13.9 (57.0) | 5.6 (42.1) |
| Average precipitation mm (inches) | 209.1 (8.23) | 193.2 (7.61) | 216.5 (8.52) | 110.7 (4.36) | 87.2 (3.43) | 78.6 (3.09) | 84.3 (3.32) | 54.5 (2.15) | 74.0 (2.91) | 125.0 (4.92) | 177.5 (6.99) | 153.0 (6.02) | 1,563.6 (61.55) |
| Average precipitation days (≥ 1.0 mm) | 18.7 | 13.9 | 17.5 | 13.4 | 13.9 | 11.3 | 9.7 | 10.8 | 13.4 | 15.9 | 16.9 | 16.1 | 171.5 |
Source: Centro Integrado de Informações Agrometeorológicas

== Media ==
In telecommunications, the city was served by Companhia de Telecomunicações do Estado de São Paulo until 1975, when it began to be served by Telecomunicações de São Paulo. In July 1998, this company was acquired by Telefónica, which adopted the Vivo brand in 2012.

The company is currently an operator of cell phones, fixed lines, internet (fiber optics/4G) and television (satellite and cable).

== See also ==
- List of municipalities in São Paulo
