= Redenção =

Redenção (Portuguese for "redemption") may refer to:

== Places ==
- Redenção, Ceará, Brazil
- Redenção, Pará, Brazil
- Redenção da Serra, São Paulo, Brazil

== Entertainment ==
- Redenção (album), the fourth album by the Brazilian alternative rock band Fresno
- Redenção (TV series), a Brazilian telenovela
