= TV Câmara Jacareí =

- Country: Brazil
- Broadcast area: Jacareí

Programming
- Language: Portuguese

History
- Launched: 28 April 2008

Availability

Terrestrial
- UHF: 61.4

TV Câmara Jacareí is a legislative television channel operated by the Câmara Municipal of Jacareí, São Paulo, Brazil. The channel broadcasts 24 hours a day on free-to-air digital television via UHF channel 61.4, is carried on NET cable channels 17 and 27, and is also available for streaming on the Câmara’s website.

== History ==
The project that gave rise to TV Câmara Jacareí was approved in September 2007. The TV station was created on April 28, 2008, to broadcast the discussions and votes of the Plenary and the Committees.The station became part of the Legislative TV Network in 2011, and until 2012 its signal was shared with TV Assembleia, from São Paulo. Therefore, TV Câmara Jacareí did not have 24-hour programming.

Starting in 2013, the station began broadcasting around the clock, stopped sharing its signal with TV Assembleia, and started airing on channels 17 and 27 of NET. Furthermore, it launched its over-the-air signal on UHF channel 61.4, being one of the pioneers in the country in this regard. In the same year, all programming began to be placed on YouTube. In 2015, TV Câmara Jacareí switched its broadcast to channel 12 exclusively on NET.

In October 2016, the broadcaster included simultaneous translation into LIBRAS, the Brazilian Sign Language, in its service offerings for all broadcasts of plenary sessions. In 2019, TV Câmara It changed its over-the-air signal from channel 61.4 to UHF channel 39.2.

In 2021, the station and the municipality jointly launched the Movimenta Jacareí project, a series of video classes for various sports.

== Slogans ==
2008 - 2012: TV Câmara Jacareí, um canal feito exclusivamente pelo Legislativo.

2013: TV Câmara Jacareí, TV mais perto de você.

2013 - 2014: TV Câmara Jacareí, a TV pública de Jacareí.

2014-: TV Câmara Jacareí, a TV pública da cidade.

== Logos ==
The current logo for TV Câmara Jacareí was created in 2013 and began being used in early 2013. It consists of two concentric "C"s pointing in opposite directions. Both are semicircular; the outer "C" is orange and in its normal position. The inner one is black and horizontally inverted.

The inner part is black and horizontally inverted. Both surround a central circle, which is orange.

with the words “TV CÂMARA” in black uppercase letters. Below, to complete the picture, the word “JACAREÍ” also in black uppercase letters, in the same font.

== Schedule ==
Current:

- Bom Dia Jacareí
- Colaboração
- Contraplano
- Espaço Parlamentar
- Gente em Destaque
- Momento Doc
- Nosso Som
- Notícias de Jacareí
- TV Câmara Entrevista
- Ação Parlamentar
- Conexão Câmara
- Dicas de Saúde
- É Lei!
- Minha Profissão
- Nossa Cidade
- Vota Cidadão
- Sessões Ordinárias;
- Sessões Solenes;
- Sessões Extraordinárias;
- Eventos Extraordinários;

Discontinued:

- É Simples Assim
- Intervalo Cidadão
- Jacareí em Dia
- Lente Esportiva
- Nossa Cidade
- Pré-pauta
- Questão de Ordem
- Seus Direitos
- Trânsito Legal
- Tribuna Popular
- Utilidade Pública
