= Potim =

- Municipality
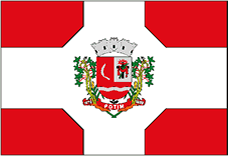
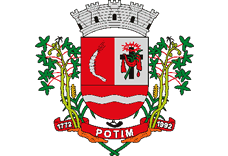
- Flag Coat of arms

- Location in São Paulo state

- Location in Brazil
- Coordinates: 22°50′34″S 45°15′5″W
- Country: Brazil
- Region: Southeast Brazil
- State: São Paulo
- Metropolitan Region: Vale do Paraíba e Litoral Norte

Area
  - Total: 44.47 km^{2} (17.17 sq mi)
- Elevation: 535 m (1,755 ft)

Population (2020)
  - Total: 25,130
  - Density: 565.1/km^{2} (1,464/sq mi)
- Time zone: UTC−3 (BRT)

Potim is a municipality in the state of São Paulo in Brazil. It is part of the Metropolitan Region of Vale do Paraíba e Litoral Norte. The population is 25,130 (2020 est.) in an area of 44.47 km^{2} (17.17 sq mi). The elevation is 535 m.

== History ==
The settlement developed slowly. It became a fishing and rural workers' village. At the time of Brazil's independence, the neighborhood was the largest producer of cassava in Guaratinguetá. During this period, in addition to coffee, sugar, brown sugar, corn, beans and the famous cassava flour were also produced. In 1900, the bridge connecting Potim to Aparecida was inaugurated, built with wood from the old Pedregulho bridge in Guaratinguetá, which had been replaced by a metal bridge in the previous century. The bridge was built and owned by Francisco José de Castro and cost around one thousand contos de réis, which after a while was swept away by the current of the Paraíba do Sul River and a ferry was introduced to cross the river in 1914. It was only in 1966 that the then State Governor, Ademar de Barros Filho, inaugurated a reinforced concrete bridge, which still stands today, although it has traffic restrictions. Later, the new reinforced concrete bridge was inaugurated by the State Governor Eng. Mário Covas, parallel to the previous one, 300 meters downstream, but more modern and named "Ministro Roberto Cardoso Alves", connecting Potim to the city of Aparecida, the main access point, the gateway to the city since there is no direct entrance to the municipality via a highway.

=== Emancipation ===
On December 23, 1981, the District of Potim was created by Law 3,198.

Potim District: Subprefecture/Subprefects

The District of Potim had four Subprefects appointed, but only three were officially sworn in. They were:

1. Claudio Doan Del Mônaco Braga, a businessman, was appointed but not sworn in. The Subprefecture of Potim was created by then-Mayor of Guaratinguetá, Dr. Antônio Gilberto Filippo Fernandes, at the end of his first term. Claudio was appointed as the first Subprefect, but due to time constraints, he was never sworn in. Shortly after, the new Mayor, Dr. Walter de Oliveira Mello, abolished the Subprefecture at the beginning of his administration.
2. Dr. Ivo Lemes, a lawyer, was appointed and sworn in by Mayor Walter de Oliveira Mello, at the request of Councilman Jones dos Santos, when the Subprefecture was reinstated.
3. Vicente Francisco de Paula Júnior, a civil engineer, was appointed and sworn in by Mayor Antônio Gilberto Filippo Fernandes during his second term. His appointment was supported by Councilwoman Maria José da Anunciação Guimarães and the Association of Friends of the District, and was approved by the City Council of Guaratinguetá.
4. Gilberto Alves Lino, a community leader, was the final Subprefect, also appointed and sworn in by Mayor Fernandes in his second term. Like Vicente, his appointment was supported by Councilwoman Maria José da Anunciação Guimarães and the Association of Friends of the District, with City Council approval.

Gilberto Alves Lino served as the last Deputy Mayor, heading the Subprefecture of Potim until December 31, 1992. During his tenure, he acted as the political-administrative liaison between the Municipal Administration of Guaratinguetá and the Emancipation Commission. This role was crucial during the transition leading up to the inauguration of Potim’s first popularly elected Mayor, Dr. Élio Andrade Nogueira, on January 1, 1993 — marking the beginning of the newly emancipated Municipality of Potim.

Emancipation Committee: In March 1988, a committee of people interested in the development of the District, which had received little attention from the leaders of the Municipality of Guaratinguetá, collected one hundred signatures from voters registered in the Electoral District of Potim and, with the strong support of the current Mayor and Vice-Mayor, gathered the necessary documentation and forwarded a request for Political and Administrative Emancipation to the Legislative Assembly of the state of São Paulo, which was received and registered by the then President of the Assembly.

After the legal procedures, the emancipation process was approved by the State Legislative Assembly and the Distinguished Regional Electoral Court set the date of May 19, 1991, for the plebiscite consultation.

The plebiscite was held with the following result:

Total number of voters - 3,822

Yes - 2,467

No - 91

Voids - 27

Did not show up - 1,216

Municipality of Potim - On December 30, 1991, the Governor of the state of São Paulo, Luiz Antonio Fleury Filho, sanctioned Law No. 7664/91, which legally formalized the emancipation of the former District of Potim from the Municipality of Guaratinguetá.

Municipal Administration - The first mayor elected by the people was Élio Andrade Nogueira.

On January 1, 1997, the second administration of the Municipal Executive of Potim was installed, led by Mayor João Benedito Angelieri and having as Vice-Mayor José Silvio Bueno Machado.

== Media ==
In telecommunications, the city was served by Telecomunicações de São Paulo. In July 1998, this company was acquired by Telefónica, which adopted the Vivo brand in 2012. The company is currently an operator of cell phones, fixed lines, internet (fiber optics/4G) and television (satellite and cable).

== See also ==
- List of municipalities in São Paulo
