= Arapeí =

Municipality in Brazil

- Municipality
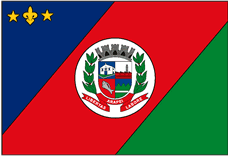
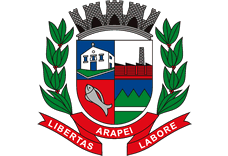
- Flag Coat of arms

- Location in São Paulo state

- Location in Brazil
- Coordinates: 22°40′28″S 44°26′55″W
- Country: Brazil
- Region: Southeast Brazil
- State: São Paulo
- Metropolitan Region: Vale do Paraíba e Litoral Norte

Area
  - Total: 156.90 km^{2} (60.58 sq mi)
- Elevation: 510 m (1,670 ft)

Population (2020)
  - Total: 2,460
  - Density: 15.7/km^{2} (40.6/sq mi)
- Time zone: UTC−3 (BRT)

Arapeí is a Brazilian municipality of the eastern part of the state of São Paulo. It is part of the Metropolitan Region of Vale do Paraíba e Litoral Norte. The population is 2,460 (2020 est.) in an area of 156.90 km^{2} (60.58 sq mi). Its bordering cities are Resende and Barra Mansa (both in the state of Rio de Janeiro) in the north, Bananal in the southeast and São José do Barreiro in the west.

== Demographics ==
Historical population (municipality)
Year	Population	%±
2000	2,618	—
2010	2,493	−4.8%
2022	2,330	−6.5%

== Media ==
In telecommunications, the city was served by Telecomunicações de São Paulo. In July 1998, this company was acquired by Telefónica, which adopted the Vivo brand in 2012. The company is currently an operator of cell phones, fixed lines, internet (fiber optics/4G) and television (satellite and cable).

== See also ==
- List of municipalities in São Paulo
