= Mananciais do Rio Paraíba do Sul Environmental Protection Area =

Environmental protection area in São Paulo, Brazil

- Área de Proteção Ambiental Mananciais da Bacia Hidrográfica do rio Paraíba do Sul
- IUCN category V (protected landscape/seascape)
- Location within Brazil
- Coordinates: 23°12′28″S 46°06′56″W
- Area: 292,000 hectares (720,000 acres)
- Designation: Environmental protection area
- Created: 13 September 1982
- Administrator: Chico Mendes Institute for Biodiversity Conservation

The Mananciais do Rio Paraíba do Sul Environmental Protection Area (Portuguese: Área de Proteção Ambiental Mananciais da Bacia Hidrográfica do rio Paraíba do Sul) is an environmental protection area in the state of São Paulo, Brazil.

== Location ==
The Mananciais do Rio Paraíba do Sul Environmental Protection Area has an area of about 292,000 hectares (720,000 acres). In São Paulo it covers parts of the municipalities of Areias, Arujá, Bananal, Cachoeira Paulista, Cruzeiro, Guaratinguetá, Guarulhos, Igaratá, Jacareí, Jambeiro, Lavrinhas, Monteiro Lobato, Natividade da Serra, Paraibuna, Piquete, Queluz, Redenção da Serra, Santa Branca, Santa Isabel, Silveiras, São José do Barreiro, São José dos Campos and Taubaté.

Altitudes range from 500 to 2,500 metres (1,600 to 8,200 ft). Temperatures range from 0 to 43 °C (32 to 109 °F) with an average of 16 °C (61 °F). The APA contains the Paraibuna, Santa Branca and Rio Jaguari reservoirs. It covers parts of the basins of the Paraitinga and Paraibuna rivers, tributaries of the Paraíba do Sul, as well as the basins of the Jaguari, Buquira, Una, Bocaina and Bananal rivers.

== Environment ==
The vegetation is in the Atlantic Forest biome, with dense high montane, montane and low montane rainforest. In the lower, warmer slopes of the Paraíba Valley there is semi-deciduous forest with cerrado enclaves. Cerrado species include Alibertia elliptica, Cupania oblongifolia and Miconia ferruginata. Endemic species of fauna include buffy-tufted marmoset (Callithrix aurita), white-bearded antshrike (Biatas nigropectus), brown-backed parrotlet (Touit melanonotus) and vinaceous-breasted amazon (Amazona vinacea).

== History ==
Mananciais do Rio Paraíba do Sul Environmental Protection Area was created by federal decree 87.561 on 13 September 1982 to restore and protect the hydrographic basin of the Paraíba do Sul. It is administered by the Chico Mendes Institute for Biodiversity Conservation (ICMBio). It is classed as IUCN protected area category V (protected landscape/seascape). The purpose is to protect the sources of the Paraiba do Sul, to protect biological diversity, to control settlement and to ensure sustainable use of natural resources.

On 9 April 2012 a working group was established to coordinate environmental assessment of forest fragments in the APA. The municipality of São José dos Campos gave ICMBio the right to use an old weaving mill in the Burle Marx City Park, which was being prepared in 2013. The building would be used by municipal, state and federal environmental agencies and environmental police. The APA is part of the Mantiqueira Mosaic of conservation units, established in 2006.

== Sources ==
- APA Bacia do Rio Paraíba do Sul (in Portuguese), ICMBio: Chico Mendes Institute for Biodiversity Conservation
- APA Mananciais da Bacia Hidrográfica do rio Paraíba do Sul (in Portuguese), ISA: Instituto Socioambiental
- o mosaico mantiqueira (in Portuguese), Mosaico Mantiqueira, archived from the original on 2016-09-27
- Sandra Tavares (17 January 2013), APA Mananciais do Rio Paraíba do Sul terá sede reformada (in Portuguese)
- Unidade de Conservação: Área de Proteção Ambiental Bacia Hidrográfica do Paraíba do Sul (in Portuguese), MMA: Ministério do Meio Ambiente
