= Paraíba Valley and North Coast metropolitan area =

Map of the Metropolitan Region of Vale do Paraíba e Litoral Norte

The Metropolitan Region of Vale do Paraíba e Litoral Norte (Portuguese: Região Metropolitana do Vale do Paraíba e Litoral Norte) is an administrative division of the state of São Paulo in Brazil. It was created in 2012. It takes its name from the Paraíba Valley and the northern coast of São Paulo state. Its seat is in São José dos Campos, the most populous municipality in the region. It consists of the following municipalities:

- Aparecida
- Arapeí
- Areias
- Bananal
- Caçapava
- Cachoeira Paulista
- Campos do Jordão
- Canas
- Caraguatatuba
- Cruzeiro
- Cunha
- Guaratinguetá
- Igaratá
- Ilhabela
- Jacareí
- Jambeiro
- Lagoinha
- Lavrinhas
- Lorena
- Monteiro Lobato
- Natividade da Serra
- Paraibuna
- Pindamonhangaba
- Piquete
- Potim
- Queluz
- Redenção da Serra
- Roseira
- Santa Branca
- Santo Antônio do Pinhal
- São Bento do Sapucaí
- São José do Barreiro
- São José dos Campos
- São Luiz do Paraitinga
- São Sebastião
- Silveiras
- Taubaté
- Tremembé
- Ubatuba
