= Monteiro Lobato, São Paulo =

Monteiro Lobato
- Municipality
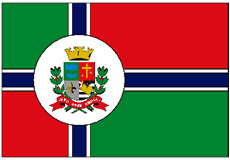
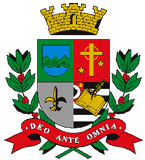
- Flag Coat of arms

- Location in São Paulo state

- Location in Brazil
- Coordinates: 22°57′24″S 45°50′23″W
- Country: Brazil
- Region: Southeast Brazil
- State: São Paulo
- Metropolitan Region: Vale do Paraíba e Litoral Norte

Area
  - Total: 332.74 km^{2} (128.47 sq mi)

Population (2020)
  - Total: 4,696
  - Density: 14.11/km^{2} (36.55/sq mi)
- Time zone: UTC−3 (BRT)

Monteiro Lobato is a municipality in the state of São Paulo in Brazil. It is part of the Metropolitan Region of Vale do Paraíba e Litoral Norte. The population is 4,696 (2020 est.) in an area of 332.74 km^{2} (128.47 sq mi).

== History ==
The municipality was created by state law in 1948.

Map of the state of São Paulo (1948).

The municipality was named in honor of Brazilian writer José Bento Monteiro Lobato, who was born in the nearby city of Taubaté, and had a farm in the area of the municipality.

== Geography ==
The municipality contains part of the 292,000-hectare (720,000-acre) Mananciais do Rio Paraíba do Sul Environmental Protection Area, created in 1982 to protect the sources of the Paraíba do Sul river.

== Media ==
In telecommunications, the city was served by Companhia de Telecomunicações do Estado de São Paulo until 1975, when it began to be served by Telecomunicações de São Paulo. In July 1998, this company was acquired by Telefónica, which adopted the Vivo brand in 2012.

The company is currently an operator of cell phones, fixed lines, internet (fiber optics/4G) and television (satellite and cable).

== See also ==
- List of municipalities in São Paulo
