= Silveiras =

- Municipality
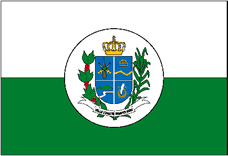
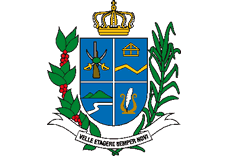
- Flag Coat of arms

- Location in São Paulo state

- Location in Brazil
- Coordinates: 22°39′50″S 44°51′10″W
- Country: Brazil
- Region: Southeast
- State: São Paulo
- Metrop. region: Vale do Paraíba e Litoral Norte

Area
  - Total: 414.78 km^{2} (160.15 sq mi)
- Elevation: 524 m (1,719 ft)

Population (2020)
  - Total: 6,339
  - Density: 15.28/km^{2} (39.58/sq mi)
- Time zone: UTC−3 (BRT)
- Postal code: 12690-xxx
- Area code: (00)55-12
- Website: www.silveiras.sp.gov.br

Silveiras is a municipality in São Paulo State, Brazil. It is part of the Metropolitan Region of Vale do Paraíba e Litoral Norte. The population is 6,339 (2020 est.) in an area of 414.78 km^{2} (160.15 sq mi). The elevation is 615 m.

The municipality contains part of the 292,000-hectare (720,000-acre) Mananciais do Rio Paraíba do Sul Environmental Protection Area, created in 1982 to protect the sources of the Paraíba do Sul river.

== Media ==
In telecommunications, the city was served by Companhia Telefônica Brasileira until 1973, when it began to be served by Telecomunicações de São Paulo. In July 1998, this company was acquired by Telefónica, which adopted the Vivo brand in 2012.

The company is currently an operator of cell phones, fixed lines, internet (fiber optics/4G) and television (satellite and cable).

== See also ==
- List of municipalities in São Paulo
