= Paraibuna =

- Municipality
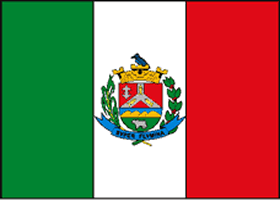
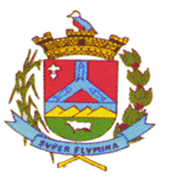
- Flag Coat of arms

- Location in São Paulo state

- Location in Brazil
- Coordinates: 23°23′10″S 45°39′44″W
- Country: Brazil
- Region: Southeast
- State: São Paulo
- Metrop. region: Vale do Paraíba e Litoral Norte

Area
  - Total: 809.58 km^{2} (312.58 sq mi)
- Elevation: 635 m (2,083 ft)

Population (2020)
  - Total: 18,263
  - Density: 22.559/km^{2} (58.427/sq mi)
- Time zone: UTC−3 (BRT)
- Postal code: 12260-xxx
- Area code: +55-12
- Website: www.paraibuna.sp.gov.br

Paraibuna is a municipality (município) in the state of São Paulo in Brazil. It is part of the Metropolitan Region of Vale do Paraíba e Litoral Norte. The population is 18,263 (2020 est.) in an area of 809.58 km^{2} (312.58 sq mi). The elevation is 635 m. The SP-99 highway passes through the town.

The municipality contains part of the 292,000-hectare (720,000-acre) Mananciais do Rio Paraíba do Sul Environmental Protection Area, created in 1982 to protect the sources of the Paraíba do Sul river.

== History ==
The city was founded on June 13, 1666, with the construction of a hut and a chapel in honor of St. Anthony. On June 3, 1773, Manuel Antonio assumed the administration of the settlement Santo Antonio da Barra de Paraibuna. In 1812 the parish was established by the Prince Regent, and made a village, which was raised to a town in 1857. From 1830 to 1870 the area was known for its coffee plantations, and many farms, including the Fazenda São Pedro, were created for that purpose. With the decline of coffee plantations, farmers started to grow cotton. During this time Paraibuna began its financial decline.

A fresh impetus came to the county with the initiation of dairy-cattle breeding since 1922. Other economic progress derived from the construction of the President Dutra Freeway (Rio de Janeiro to São Paulo) and the Tamoios Highway. Construction of the Paraibuna-Paraitinga Dam in the 1960s brought new difficulties to the community: the inundation of prime land and the exodus of agricultural workers. Today the county invests in tourism in order to improve its economy.

== Media ==
In telecommunications, the city was served by Companhia de Telecomunicações do Estado de São Paulo until 1975, when it began to be served by Telecomunicações de São Paulo. In July 1998, this company was acquired by Telefónica, which adopted the Vivo brand in 2012.

The company is currently an operator of cell phones, fixed lines, internet (fiber optics/4G) and television (satellite and cable).

== See also ==
- List of municipalities in São Paulo
