= Igaratá =

Municipality in São Paulo, Brazil

- Municipality
- Flag Coat of arms

- Location in São Paulo state

- Location in Brazil
- Coordinates: 23°12′16″S 46°9′22″W
- Country: Brazil
- Region: Southeast Brazil
- State: São Paulo
- Metropolitan Region: Vale do Paraíba e Litoral Norte

Area
  - Total: 292.95 km^{2} (113.11 sq mi)
- Elevation: 745 m (2,444 ft)

Population (2020)
  - Total: 9,583
  - Density: 32.71/km^{2} (84.72/sq mi)
- Time zone: UTC−3 (BRT)

Igaratá is a municipality in the state of São Paulo in Brazil. It is part of the Metropolitan Region of Vale do Paraíba e Litoral Norte. The population is 9,583 (2020 est.) in an area of 292.95 km^{2} (113.11 sq mi). The elevation is 745 m. This place name comes from the Tupi language.

== Geography ==
Igaratá lies adjacent to the Igaratá reservoir, fed and drained by the Jaguari River. Aquatic sports and fishery are common practice among the locals and tourists.

The municipality contains part of the 292,000-hectare (720,000-acre) Mananciais do Rio Paraíba do Sul Environmental Protection Area, created in 1982 to protect the sources of the Paraíba do Sul river.

== Economy ==
Igaratá's economy is mainly based on agriculture, because of the fertile lands bordering the Jaguari Dam. Tourism is very important to the local economy, supporting handicraft work from the local people. Cattle are also very important, thanks to the grasslands of the São Paulo Highlands.

== Media ==
In telecommunications, the city was served by Companhia de Telecomunicações do Estado de São Paulo until 1973, when it began to be served by Companhia Telefônica da Borda do Campo. In July 1998, this company was acquired by Telefónica, which adopted the Vivo brand in 2012.

The company is currently an operator of cell phones, fixed lines, internet (fiber optics/4G) and television (satellite and cable).

== See also ==
- List of municipalities in São Paulo
