= São Luiz do Paraitinga =

- Municipality
- Municipality of São Luiz do Paraitinga
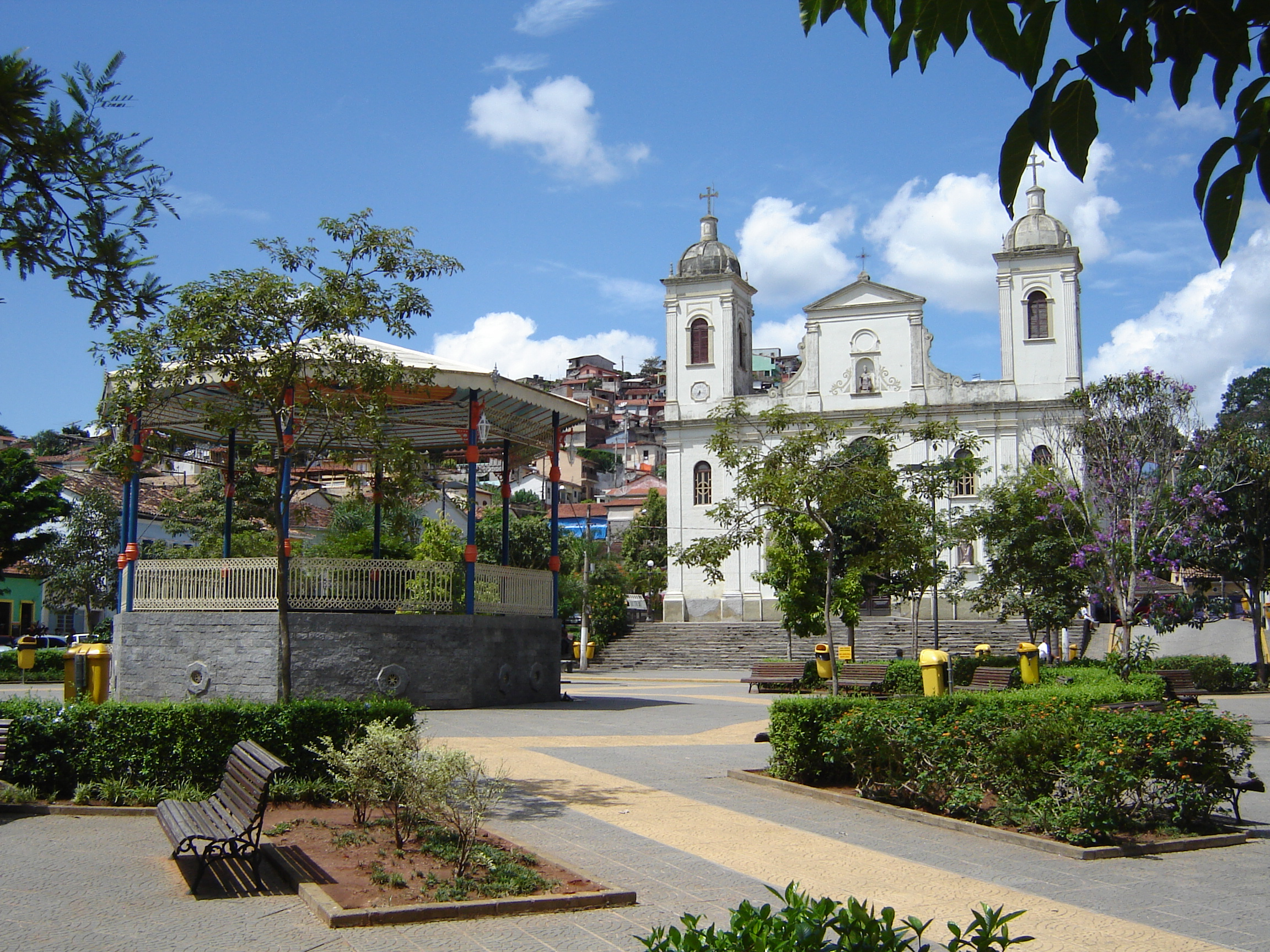
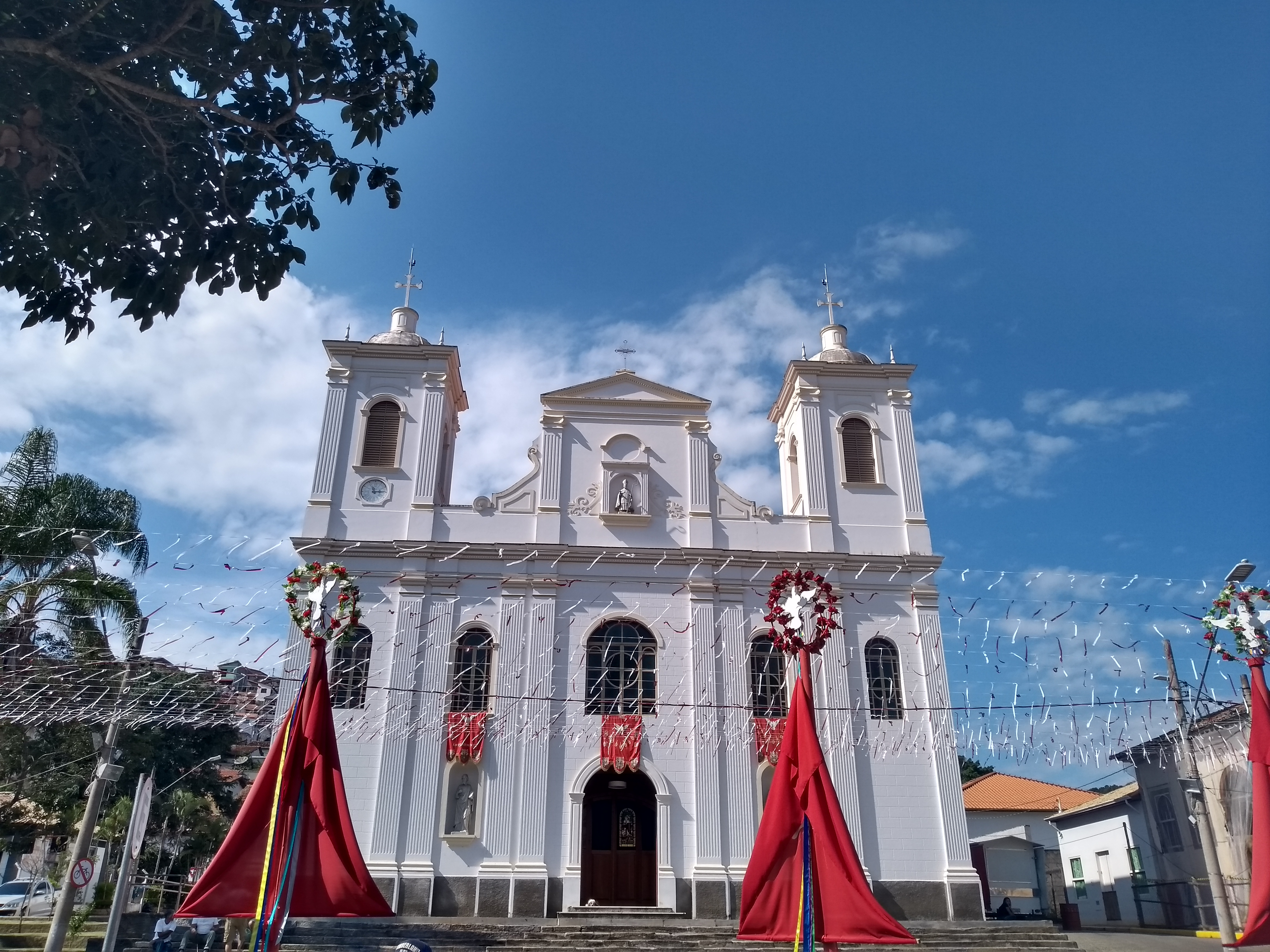
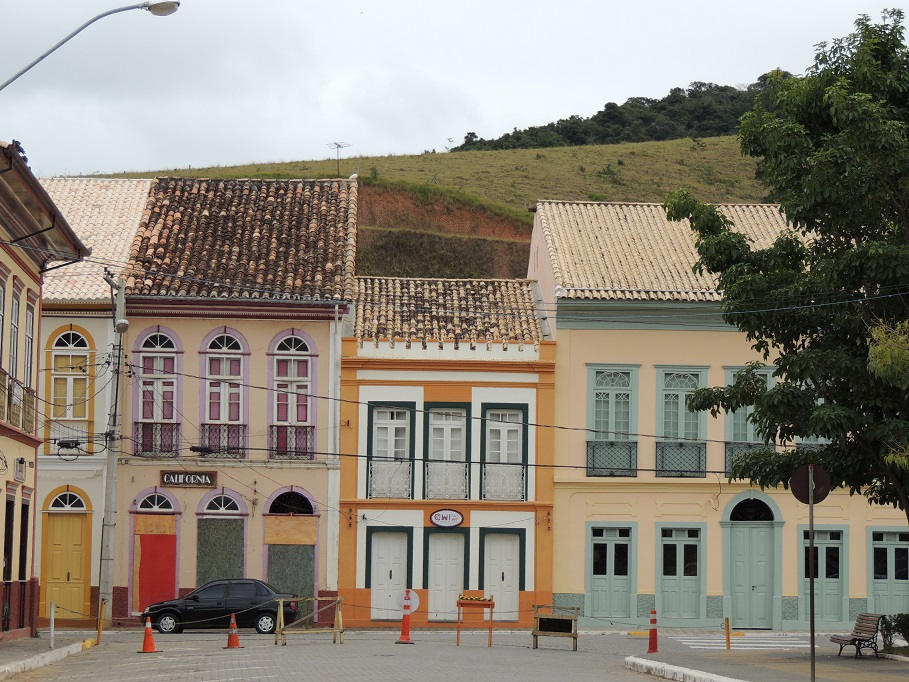
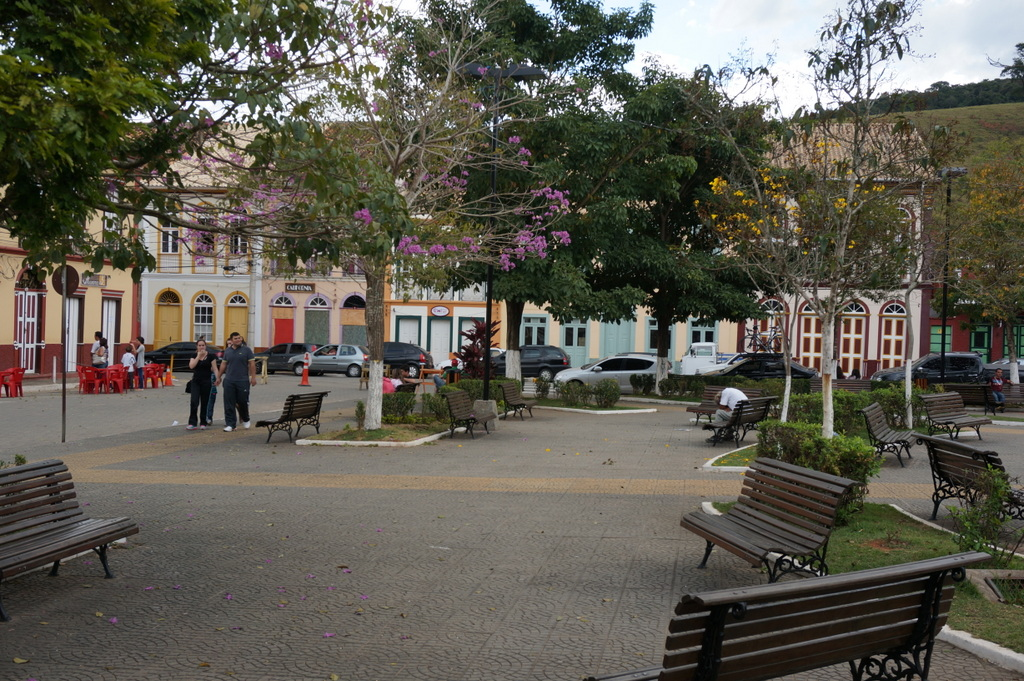
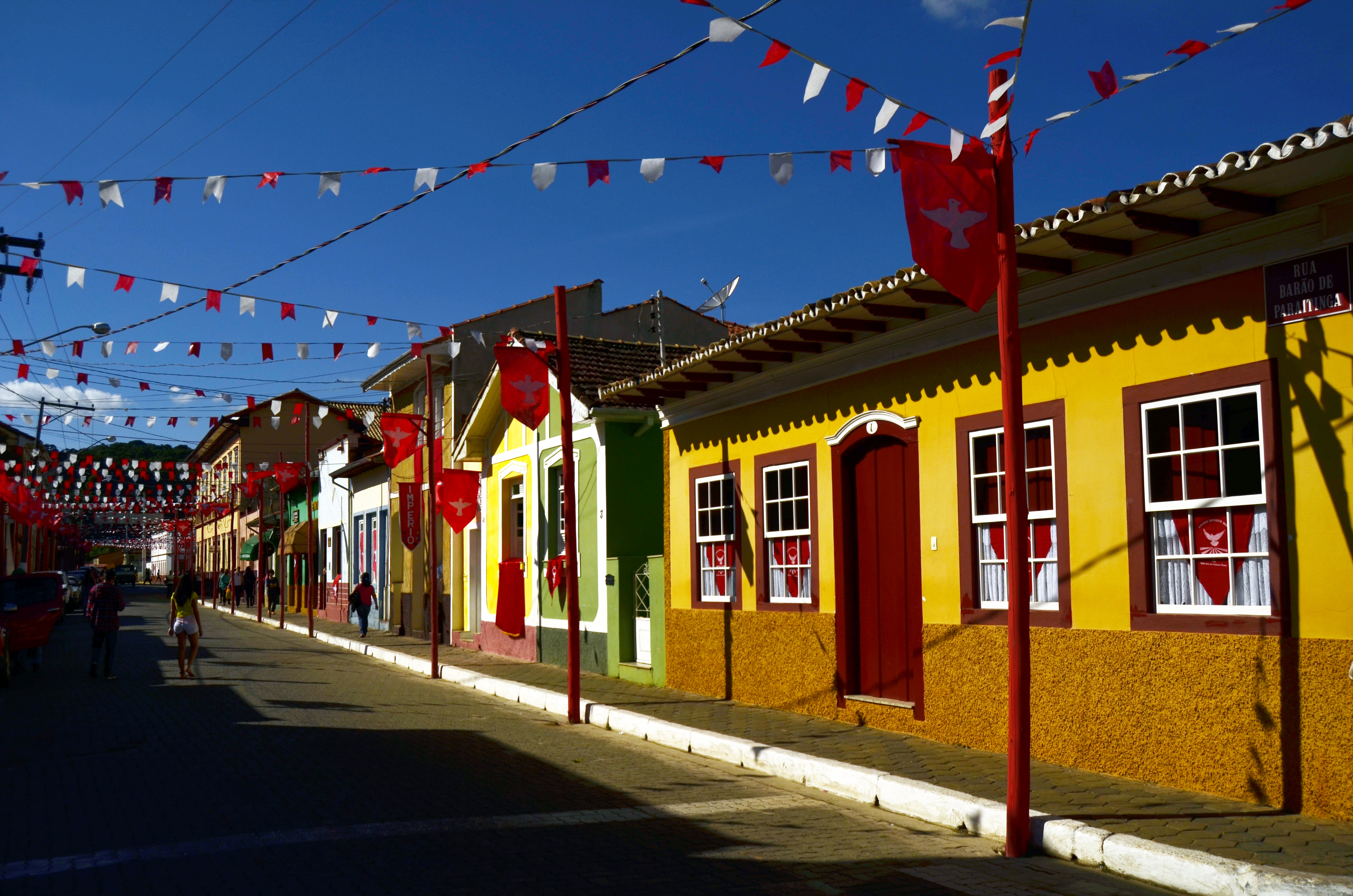

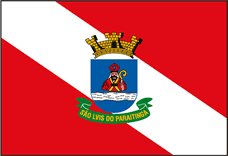
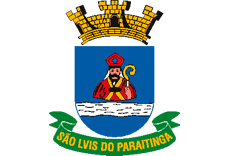
- Flag Coat of arms

- Location in São Paulo
- Coordinates: 23°13′19″S 45°18′36″W
- Country: Brazil
- Region: Southeast
- State: São Paulo
- Metropolitan Region: Vale do Paraíba e Litoral Norte

Area
  - Total: 617.148 km^{2} (238.282 sq mi)
- Elevation: 741 m (2,431 ft)

Population (2020)
  - Total: 10,690
  - Density: 17.32/km^{2} (44.86/sq mi)
- Time zone: UTC−3 (BRT)
- ZIP code: 12130-000
- Area code: +55 12
- HDI (2010): 0.697 – medium
- Website: saoluizdoparaitinga.sp.gov.br

São Luiz do Paraitinga is a municipality in the eastern part of the state of São Paulo in Brazil. The name Paraitinga comes from the Tupi language (Parahytinga) meaning clear water. The city is a major tourist destination of the Paraíba Valley region, particularly, due to its Historic Centre, declared a national heritage site, and its Caipira traditions, including the Folia do Divino and the Carnival of Marchinhas.

== History ==
The city was founded in 1769 by bandeirantes originated from Taubaté, Mogi das Cruzes e Guaratinguetá and became a municipality in 1773. It obtained city recognition in 1857 and in 1873, it was recognized as an imperial city, meaning that it was one of the 12 most important cities of Brazil at that time.

It 2002, São Luiz do Paraitinga was declared as an estância turística of the São Paulo state, a title that identifies a resort town of the state and gives it certain financial benefits in order to advance tourism.

In the first days of 2010, the city was struck by a flood of the Paraitinga river, which made it lose eight historical constructions, including the São Luiz de Tolosa Church, the city's main church, built in the 19th century.

After the flooding, the city received R$15 million from the Ministry of National Integration, plus R$100 million from the state government, for reconstruction of infrastructure and flood prevention. In December 2010, the Historic Centre of the city was declared as a national heritage site by the National Institute of Historic and Artistic Heritage (IPHAN), allowing the city to obtain federal funding for rebuilding several historical constructions, including the São Luís de Tolosa Church, expected to be re-inaugurated in April 2014.

== Geography ==
The main highway linking the cities of São Paulo and Rio de Janeiro is near this municipality. The southern part of the municipality is heavily forested and is part of the Serra do Mar mountain range. The rest of the area is farmlands and the northern part is hilly and mountainous.

== Culture ==
=== Architecture ===
São Luiz do Paraitinga contains more than 450 Portuguese colonial architecture constructions in an area larger than 6.5 million square meters, declared as National Heritage Site by the National Institute of Historic and Artistic Heritage (IPHAN). These historical constructions reflect the city's former prosperity due to coffee farming and gold mining in the 19th century.

Some of the major historical sightseeing spots are:

- Praça Oswaldo Cruz, the city's central square and main site for cultural events, containing the 1840 São Luiz de Tolosa Church
- Largo do Teatro, a crossing surrounded by picturesque houses and containing the Rosário church, built in the end of the 19th century
- Ladeira das Mercês, a historical ladder containing the 17th-century Nossa Senhora das Mercês chapel and the 1834 house of Oswaldo Cruz
- Municipal Market, built in the end of the 19th century

=== Music and dance ===
The city's trademark music genre is the Marchinha, a popular Brazilian Carnival music genre with comical tones, played during the city's Carnival and other events. Another musical tradition present in the city is the Jongo, a samba-style folk dance that is performed close to a bonfire. It can be played as a game, where each singer must improvise the verses.

The city contains two groups of Congada, a syncretist religious cultural manifestation that combines African and Iberian musical and dance elements. The Moçambique, another syncretist tradition, is a dance originally performed by African slaves under the sound of drums and tambourines. Currently São Luiz do Paraitinga has a single Moçambique group.

== Media ==
In telecommunications, the city was served by Companhia de Telecomunicações do Estado de São Paulo until 1975, when it began to be served by Telecomunicações de São Paulo. In July 1998, this company was acquired by Telefónica, which adopted the Vivo brand in 2012.

The company is currently an operator of cell phones, fixed lines, internet (fiber optics/4G) and television (satellite and cable).

== Notable people ==
- Oswaldo Cruz
- Aziz Ab'Saber

== See also ==
- List of municipalities in São Paulo
