= Lagoinha =

- Municipality
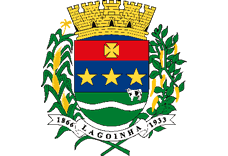
- Flag Coat of arms

- Location of Lagoinha within São Paulo state

- Location within Brazil
- Coordinates: 23°05′26″S 45°11′25″W
- Country: Brazil
- Region: Southeast Brazil
- State: São Paulo
- Metropolitan Region: Vale do Paraíba e Litoral Norte
- Founded: 1953

Area
  - Total: 255.47 km^{2} (98.64 sq mi)
- Elevation: 913 m (2,995 ft)

Population (2020)
  - Total: 4,889
  - Density: 19.14/km^{2} (49.57/sq mi)
  - Literacy rate: 85.64%
- Postal code: 1213x-xxx
- Area code: +55-12
- Website: www.lagoinha.sp.gov.br

Lagoinha is a municipality in the eastern part of the state of São Paulo, Brazil. It is part of the Metropolitan Region of Vale do Paraíba e Litoral Norte. The population is 4,889 (2020 est.) in an area of 255.47 km^{2} (98.64 sq mi). The elevation is 913 m.

Economic activity centres upon agriculture, mainly dairy cattle and reforestry. Tourism has been growing in the region due to the abundance of water sources, falls, and natural hills, valley and forest environments.

== Population history ==
Year	Population
2001	4,957
2004	5,122
2015	4,954

== Demographics ==
According to the 2000 IBGE Census, the population was 4,957, of which 2,877 or 58.04% are urban and 2,080 or (41.96%) are rural. The life expectancy for the city was 71.69 years. The fertility rate was at 2.31. The municipality has 2,585 males and 2,372 females. For every 100 males, there are 91.7 females. The literacy rate was 85.64%

== Media ==
In telecommunications, the city was served by Companhia de Telecomunicações do Estado de São Paulo until 1973, when it began to be served by Telecomunicações de São Paulo. In July 1998, this company was acquired by Telefónica, which adopted the Vivo brand in 2012.

The company is currently an operator of cell phones, fixed lines, internet (fiber optics/4G) and television (satellite and cable).

== See also ==
- List of municipalities in São Paulo
