= Lavrinhas =

- Municipality
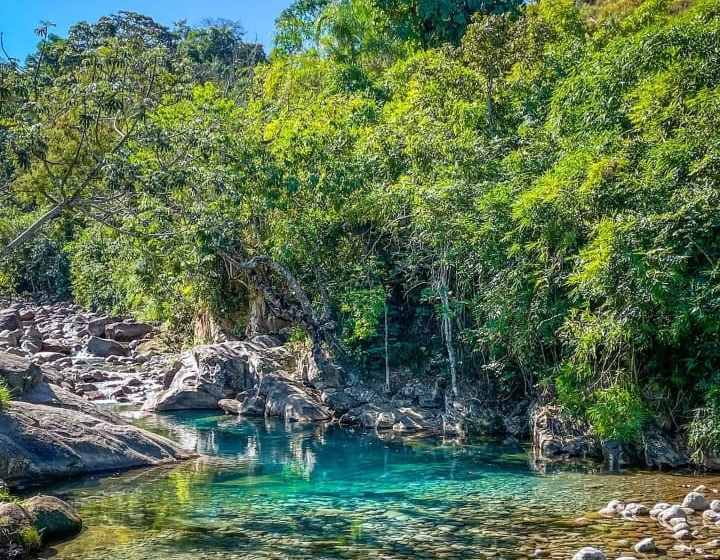
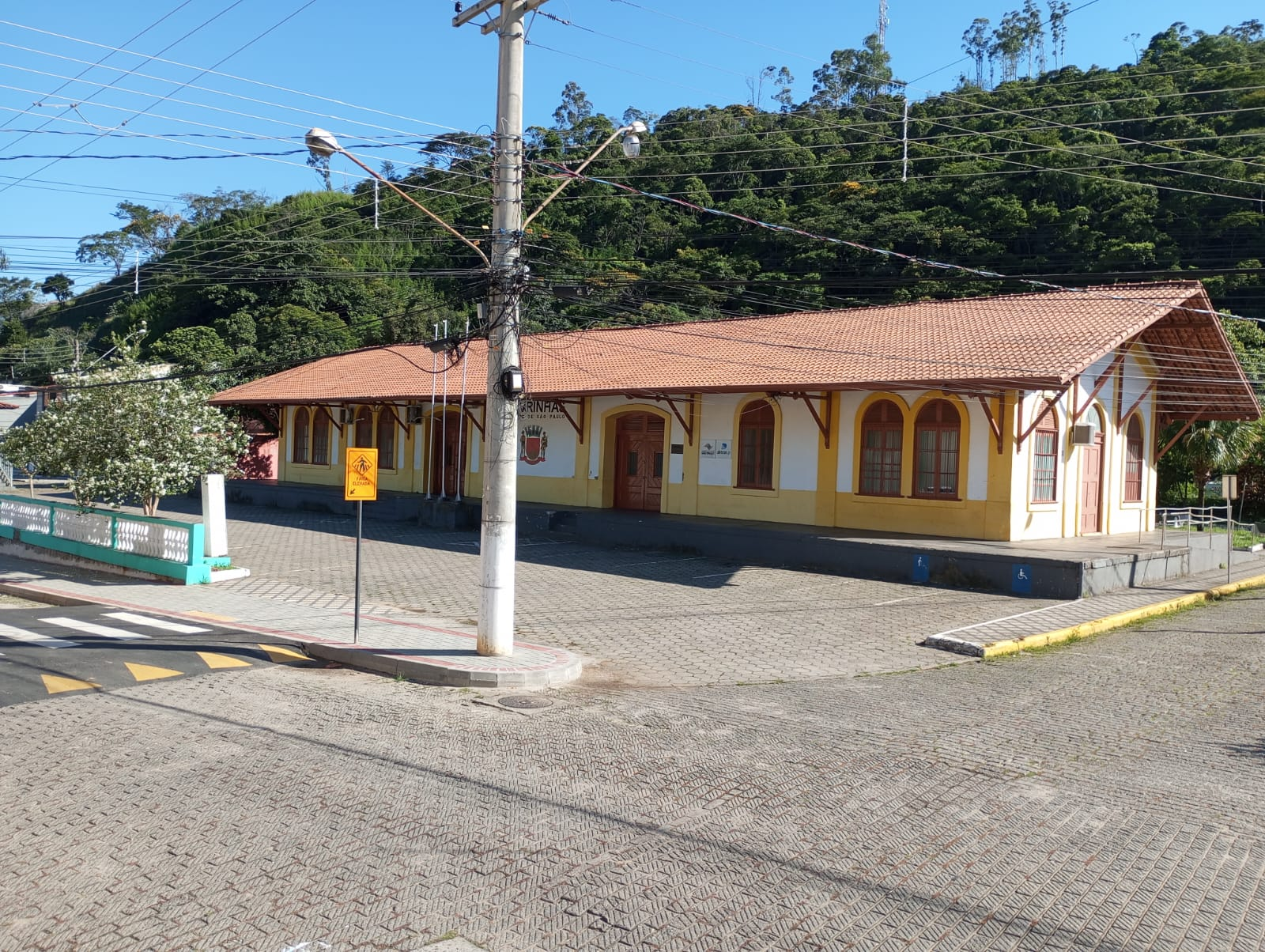
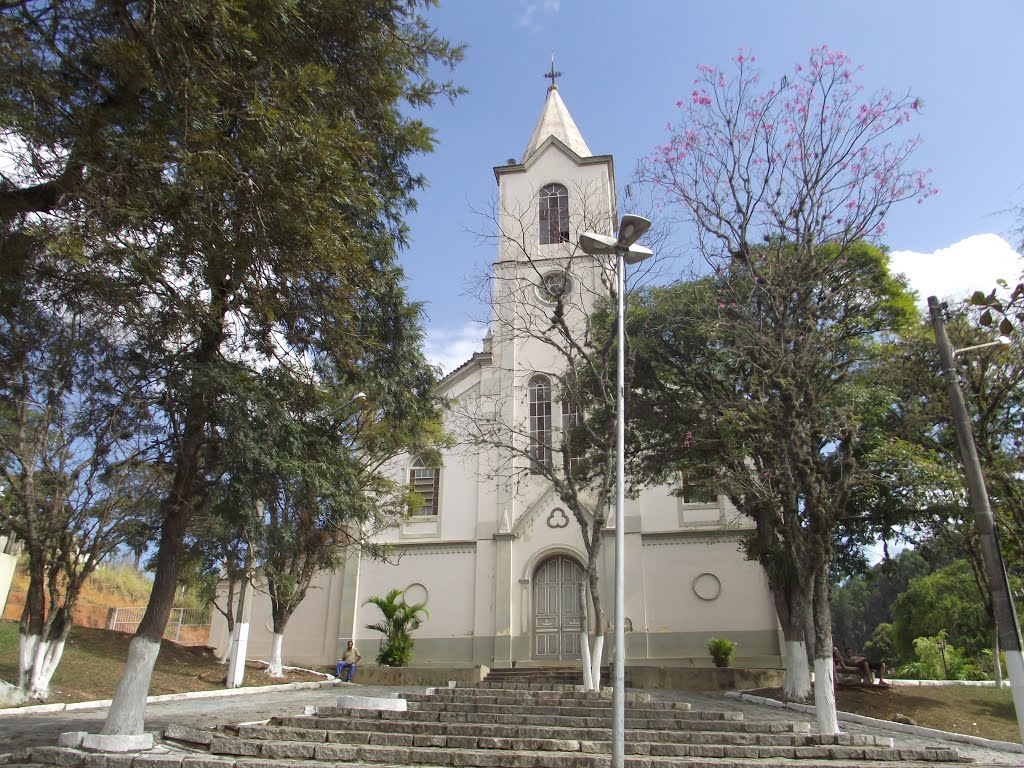
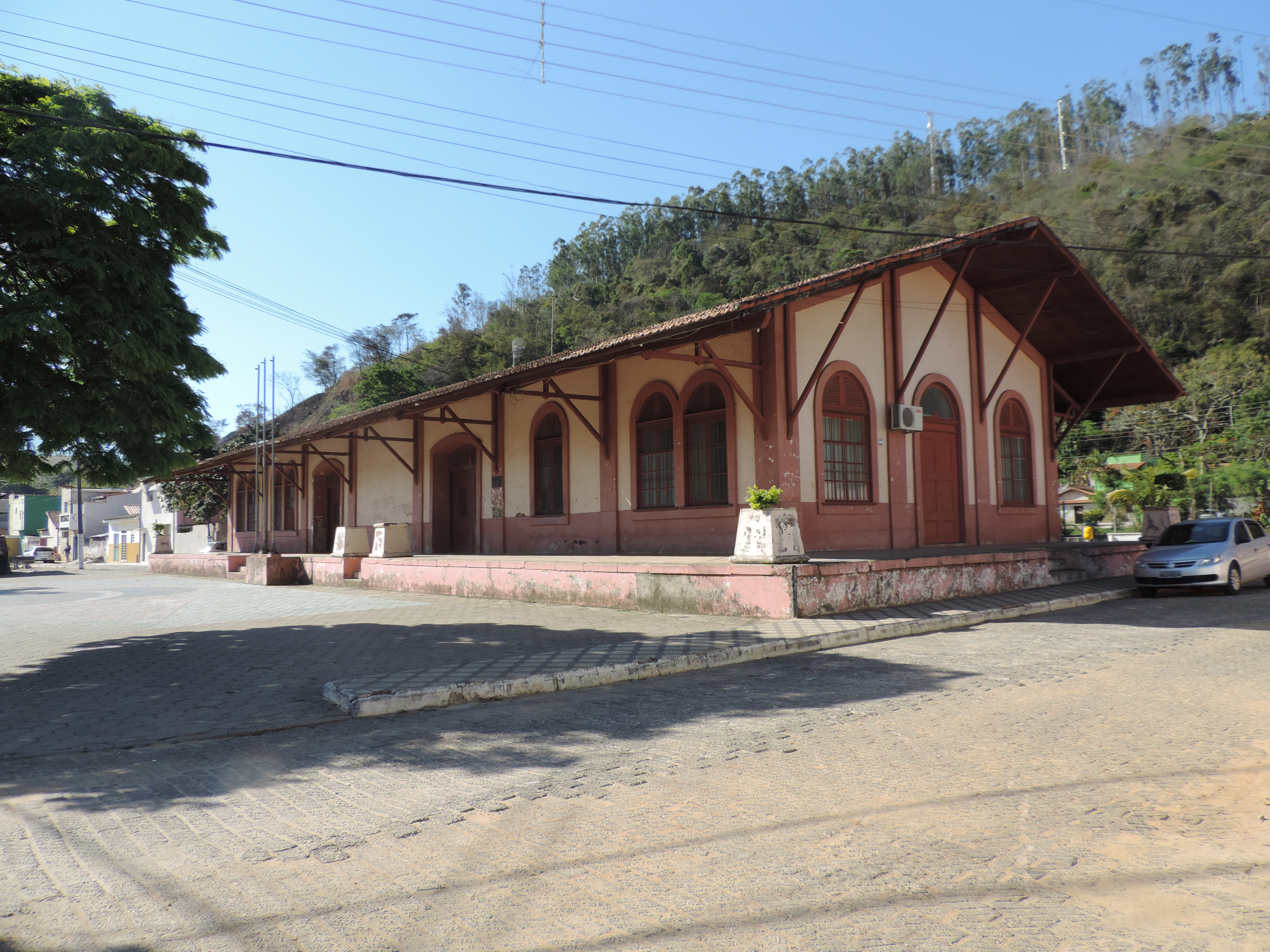
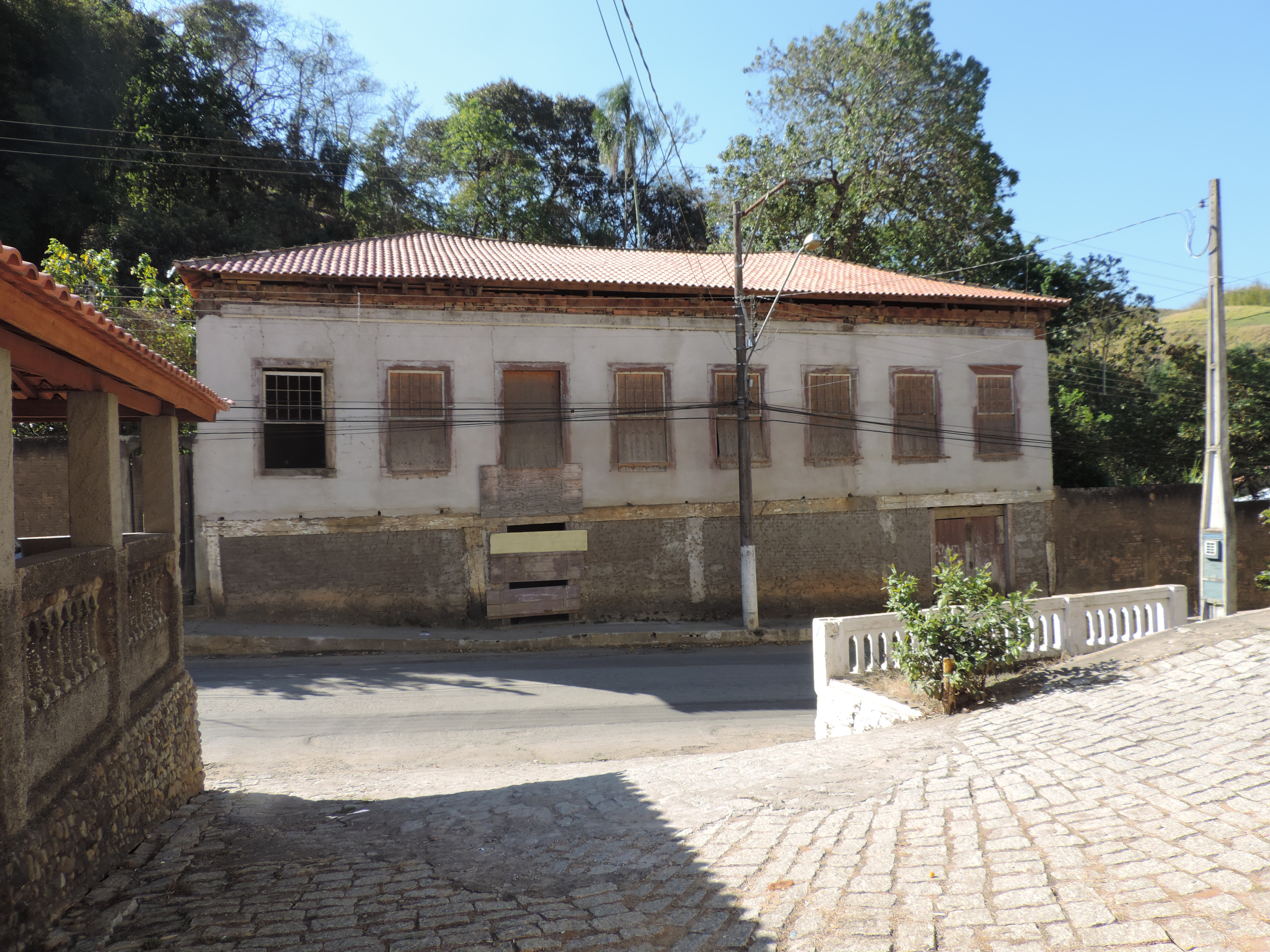
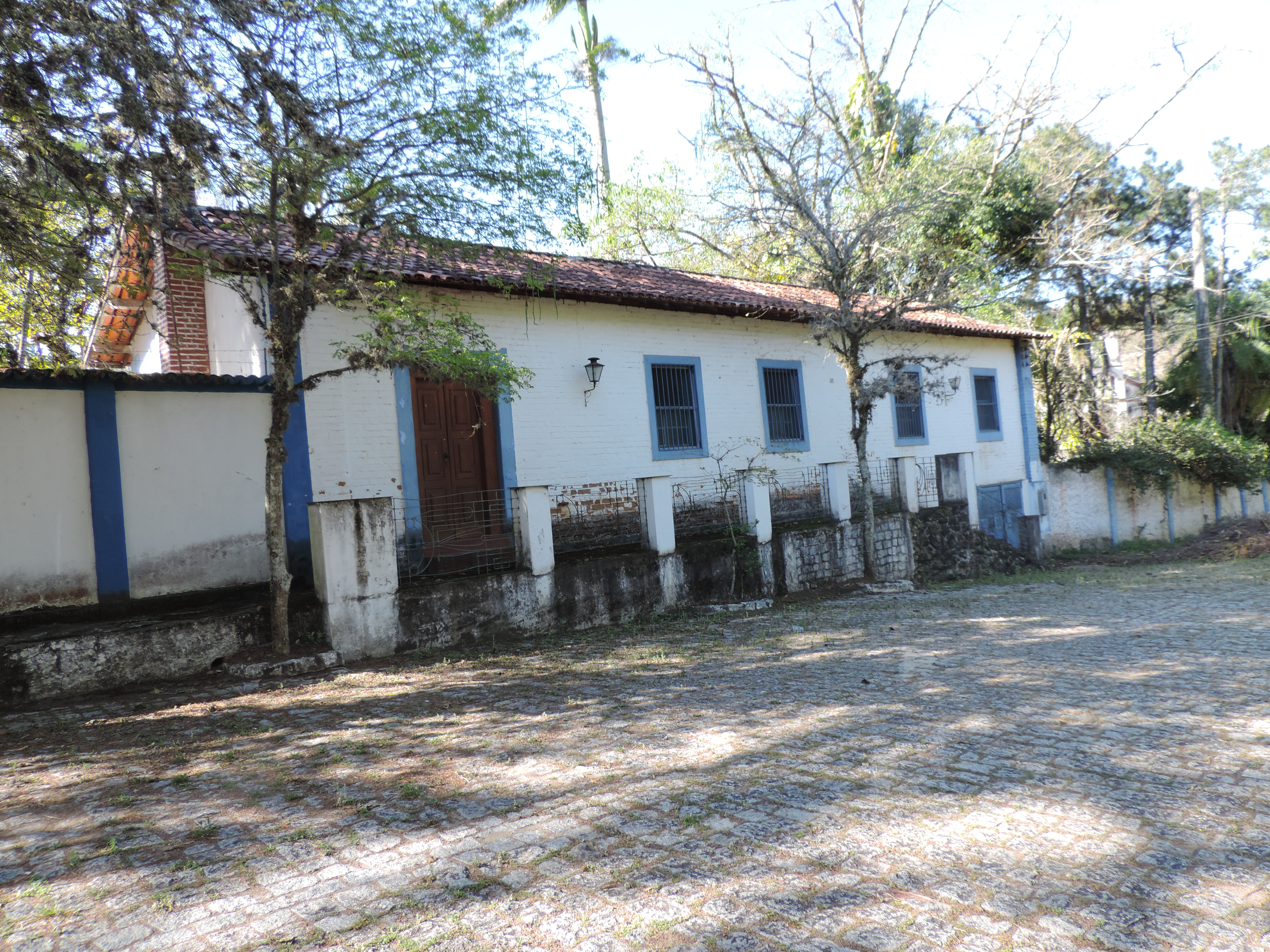
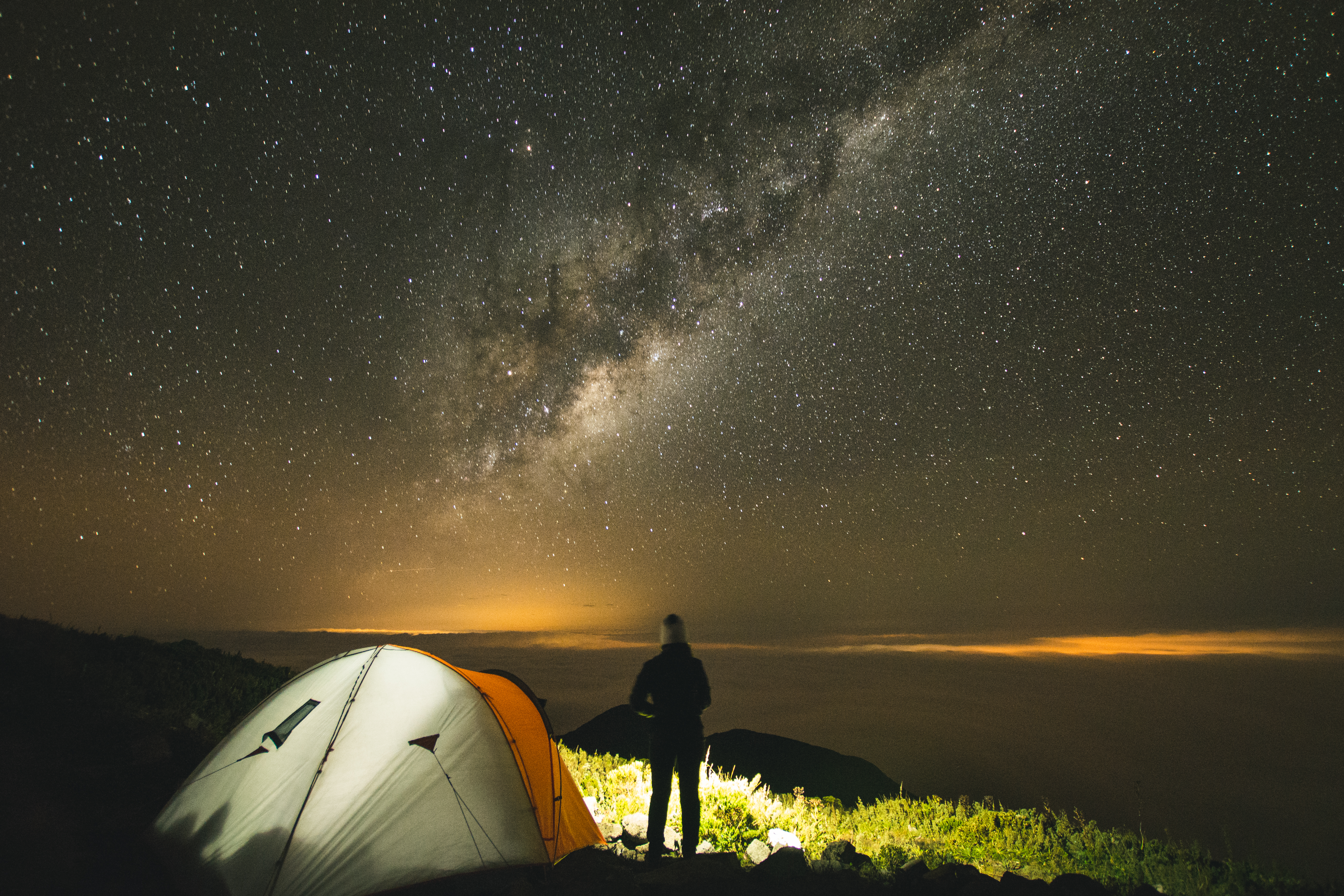
- Cachoeira da Pedreira City Hall São Francisco de Paula Church Railway Station Pinheiros District Senzala Country Club Milky Way seen from Pedra da Mina

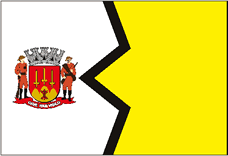
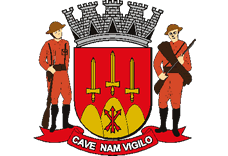
- Flag Coat of arms

- Location in São Paulo state

- Location in Brazil
- Coordinates: 22°34′15″S 44°54′8″W
- Country: Brazil
- Region: Southeast
- State: São Paulo
- Metrop. region: Vale do Paraíba e Litoral Norte

Area
  - Total: 167.07 km^{2} (64.51 sq mi)
- Elevation: 508 m (1,667 ft)

Population (2020)
  - Total: 7,311
  - Density: 43.76/km^{2} (113.3/sq mi)
- Time zone: UTC−3 (BRT)
- Postal code: 12790-xxx
- Area code: +55-19
- Website: www.lavrinhas.sp.gov.br

Lavrinhas is a municipality in the state of São Paulo in Brazil. It is formed by the neighborhoods of Jardim Mavisou, Pinheiros, Capela do Jacu, Village Campestre and Centro, where its seat is located. The municipality is crossed by many rivers, creeks etc; the main ones being Jacu River, Braço River and Paraíba do Sul River, this being its main river. It is a historical town, wherein events of the 1932 Paulista Revolution took place. As for its economy, most of it is based on agriculture, cattle raising, in addition to being known for having mineral water spring and crystal clear waters, which attract tourists from all over the country; therefore, it is recognized as a Municipality of Tourist Interest.

== History ==
The municipality was created by state law in 1944.

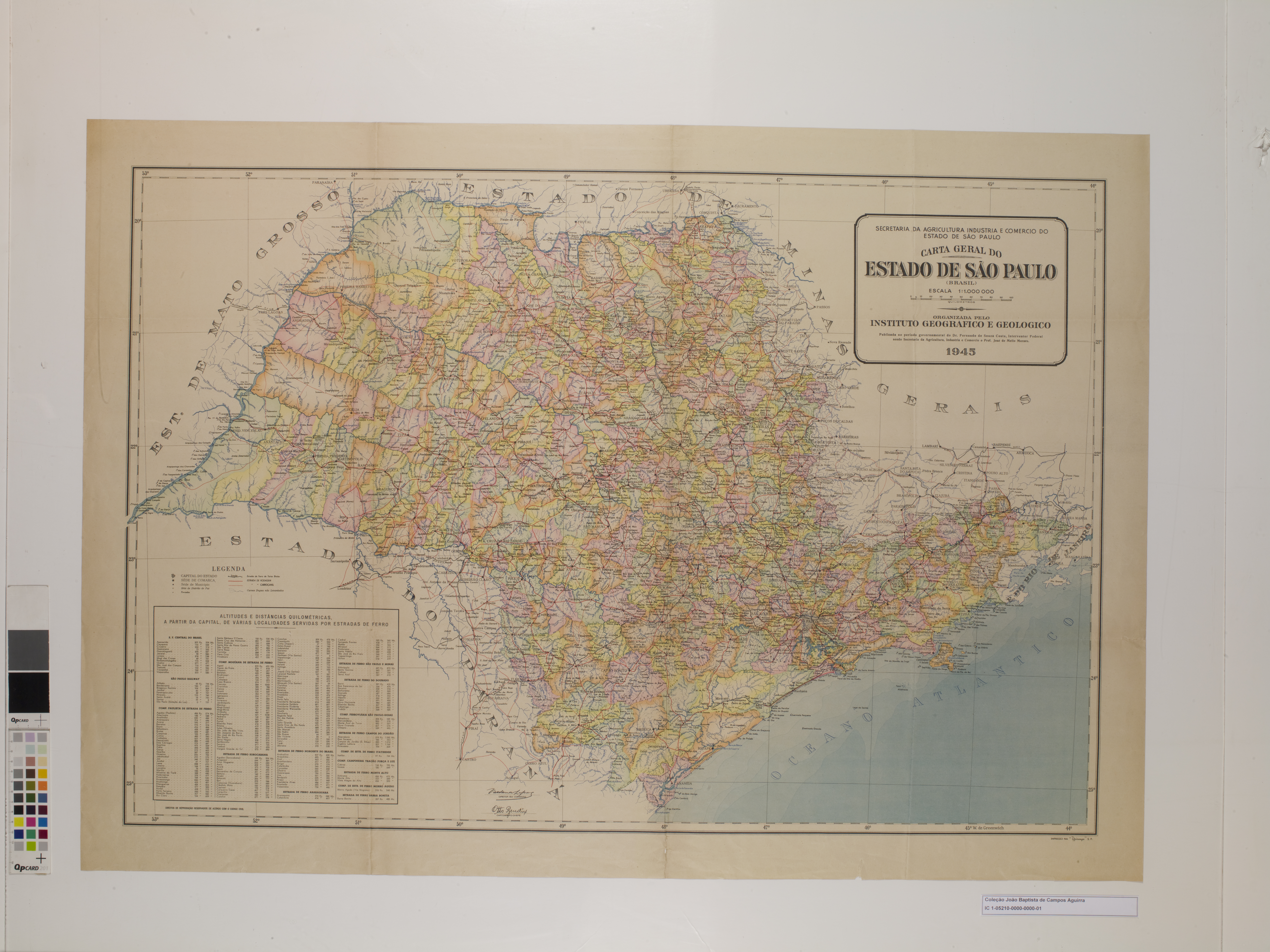
Map of the state of São Paulo (1944).

== Geography ==
=== Location ===
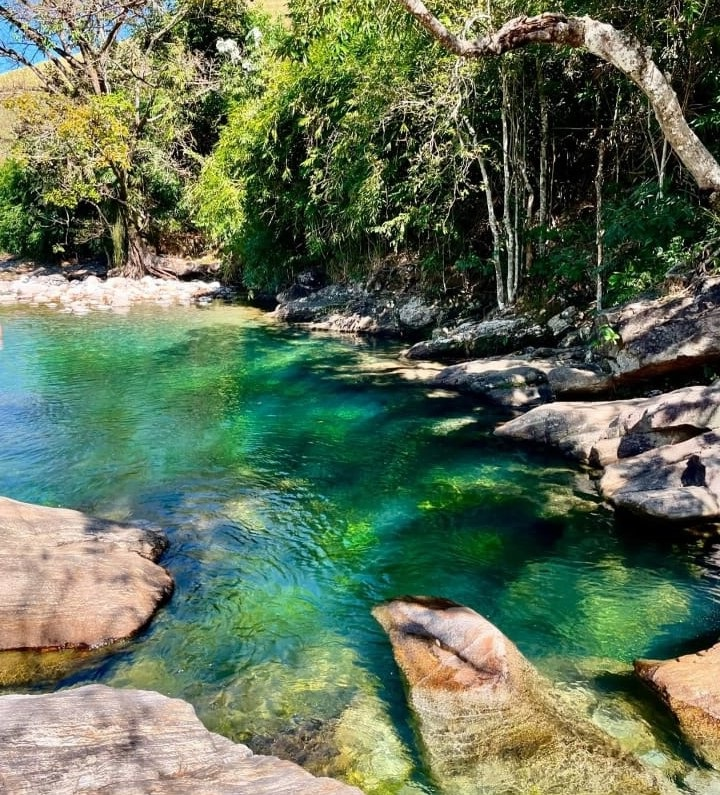
The city is known for its crystal clear waters, which attract countless tourists

Lavrinhas is part of the Metropolitan Region of Vale do Paraíba e Litoral Norte. The population is 7,361 (2021 est.) in an area of 167.07 square kilometres (64.51 sq mi). The elevation is 508 m (1,667 ft). The state of Minas Gerais is bounded to the North.

The municipality contains part of the 292,000-hectare (720,000-acre) Mananciais do Rio Paraíba do Sul Environmental Protection Area, created in 1982 to protect the sources of the Paraíba do Sul river.

== Coat of arms ==
Its coat of arms has a red shield with the tag at the bottom reading Cave nam vigilio (Latin for "Watch yourself, for I'm watching") with two soldiers on each side and with three swords over three mountaintops coloured in orange.

== Flag ==
Its flag colors are white on the left side and yellow on the right side with its coat of arms of the left. The line is not straight.

== Population history ==
Year	Population
2000	6,008
2004	6,692
2015	7,052
2021	7,361

== Media ==
In telecommunications, the city was served by Companhia Telefônica Brasileira until 1973, when it began to be served by Telecomunicações de São Paulo. In July 1998, this company was acquired by Telefónica, which adopted the Vivo brand in 2012.

The company is currently an operator of cell phones, fixed lines, internet (fiber optics/4G) and television (satellite and cable).

== See also ==
- List of municipalities in São Paulo
