= Piquete =

- Municipality
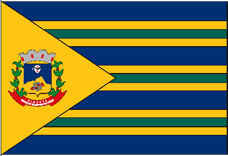
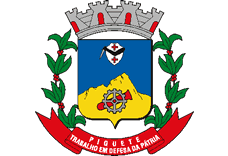
- Flag Coat of arms

- Location in São Paulo state

- Location in Brazil
- Coordinates: 22°36′50″S 45°10′33″W
- Country: Brazil
- Region: Southeast Brazil
- State: São Paulo
- Metropolitan Region: Vale do Paraíba e Litoral Norte

Area
  - Total: 176.00 km^{2} (67.95 sq mi)
- Elevation: 645 m (2,116 ft)

Population (2020)
  - Total: 13,575
  - Density: 77.131/km^{2} (199.77/sq mi)
- Time zone: UTC−3 (BRT)

Piquete is a municipality in the state of São Paulo in Brazil. It is part of the Metropolitan Region of Vale do Paraíba e Litoral Norte. The population is 13,575 (2020 est.) in an area of 176.00 km^{2}. The elevation is 645 m.

The municipality contains part of the 292,000-hectare (720,000-acre) Mananciais do Rio Paraíba do Sul Environmental Protection Area, created in 1982 to protect the sources of the Paraíba do Sul river.

== Media ==
In telecommunications, the city was served by Companhia de Telecomunicações do Estado de São Paulo until 1975, when it began to be served by Telecomunicações de São Paulo. In July 1998, this company was acquired by Telefónica, which adopted the Vivo brand in 2012.

The company is currently an operator of cell phones, fixed lines, internet (fiber optics/4G) and television (satellite and cable).

== See also ==
- List of municipalities in São Paulo
