= Queluz, São Paulo =

Queluz
- Municipality
- Municipality of Queluz
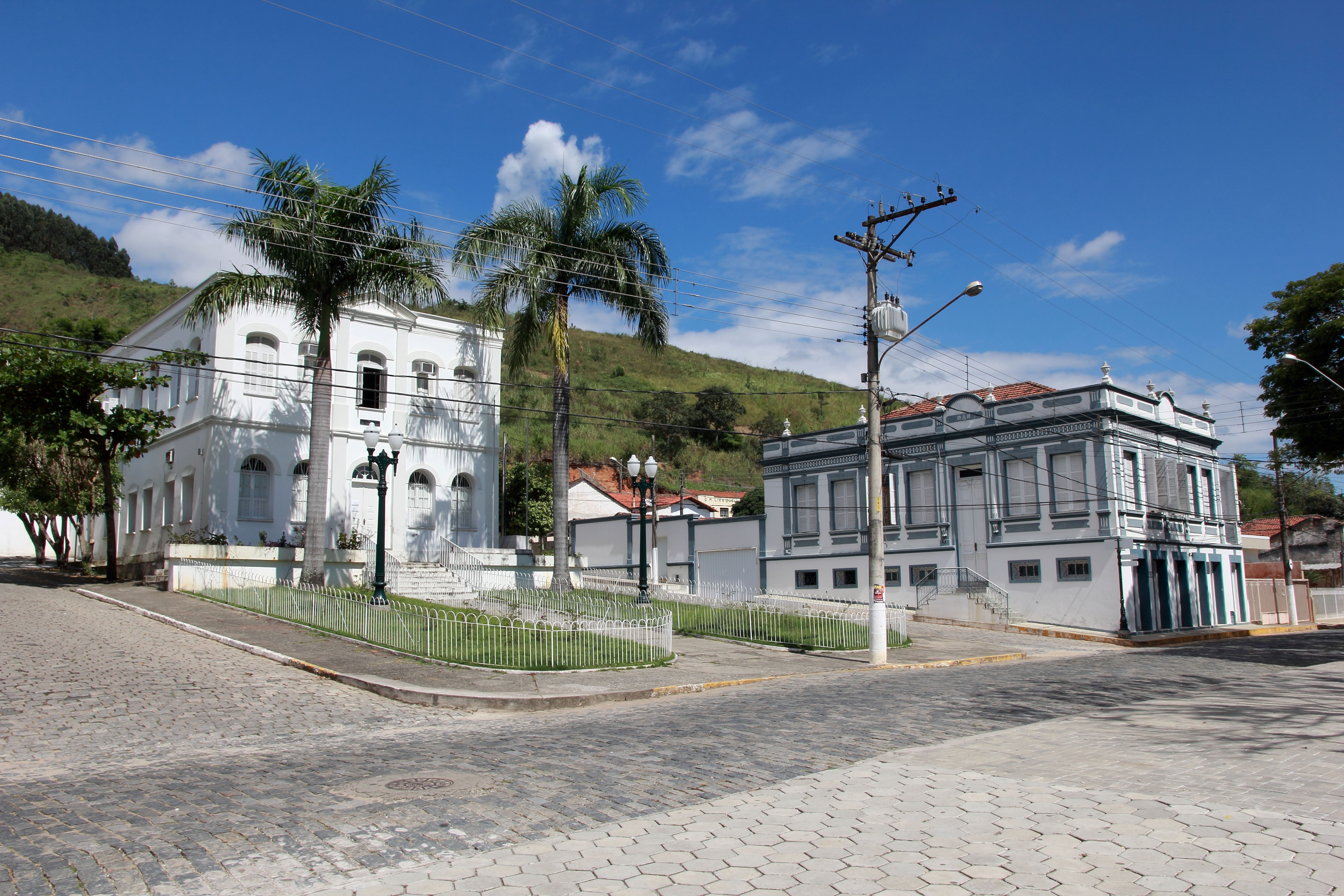
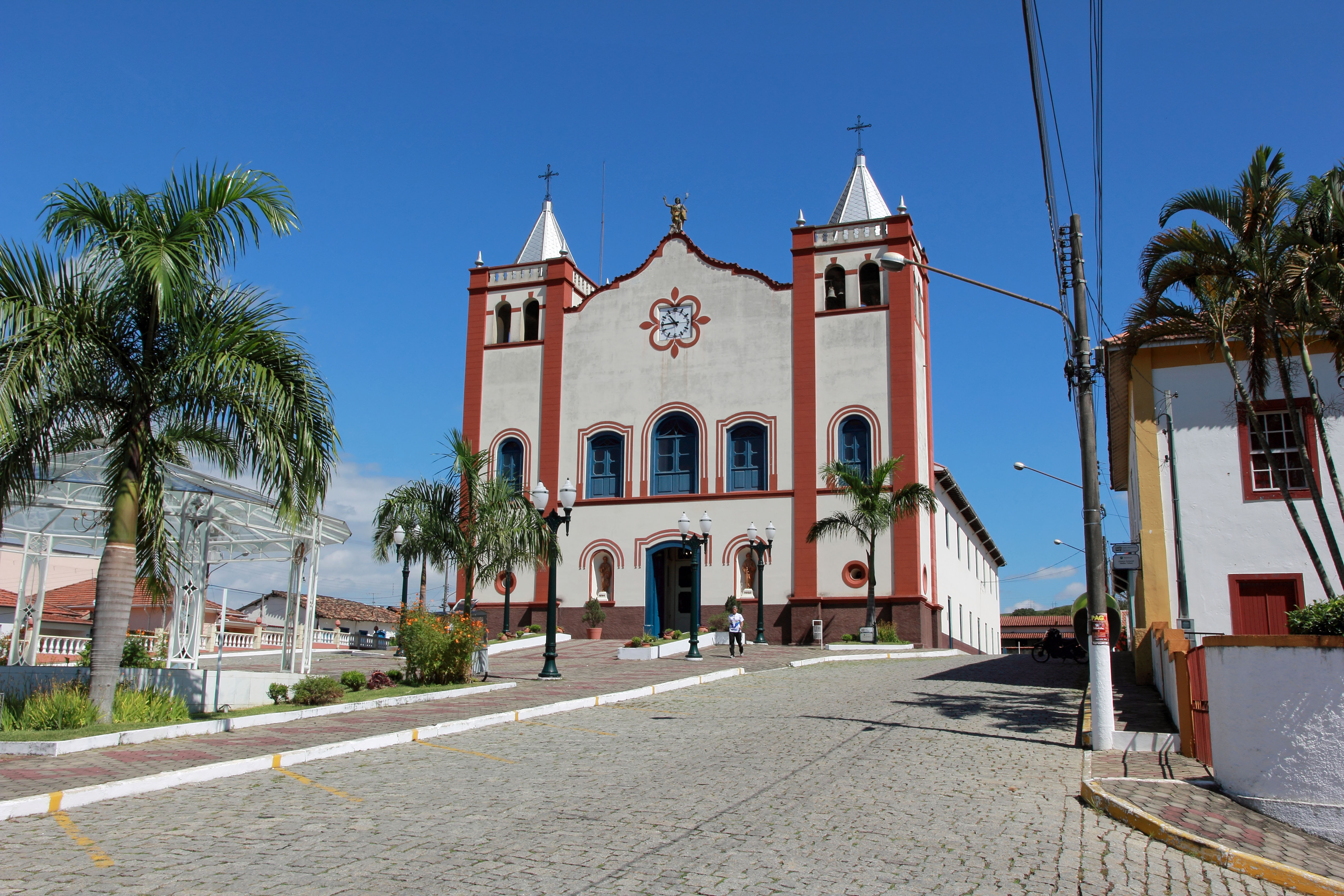
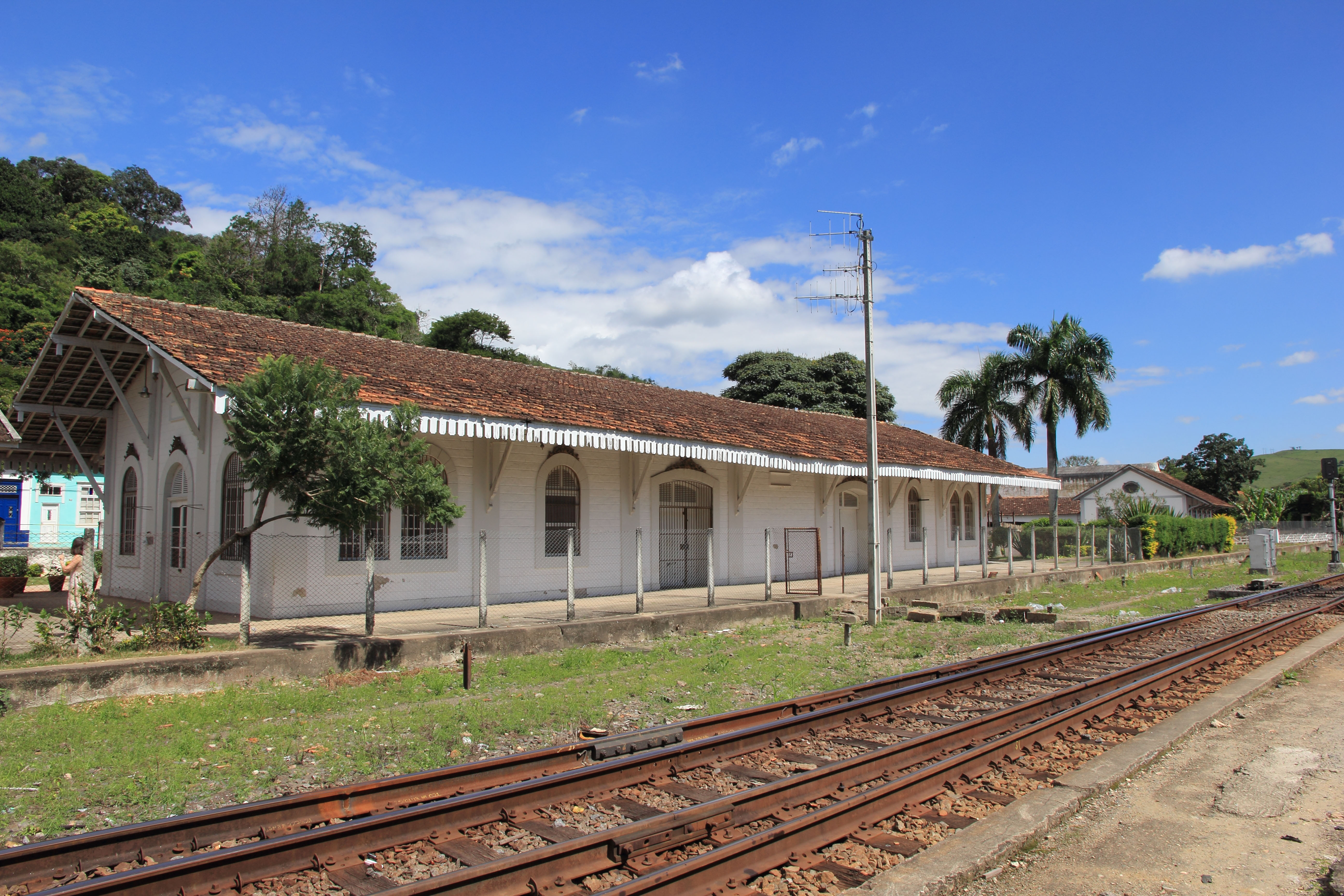
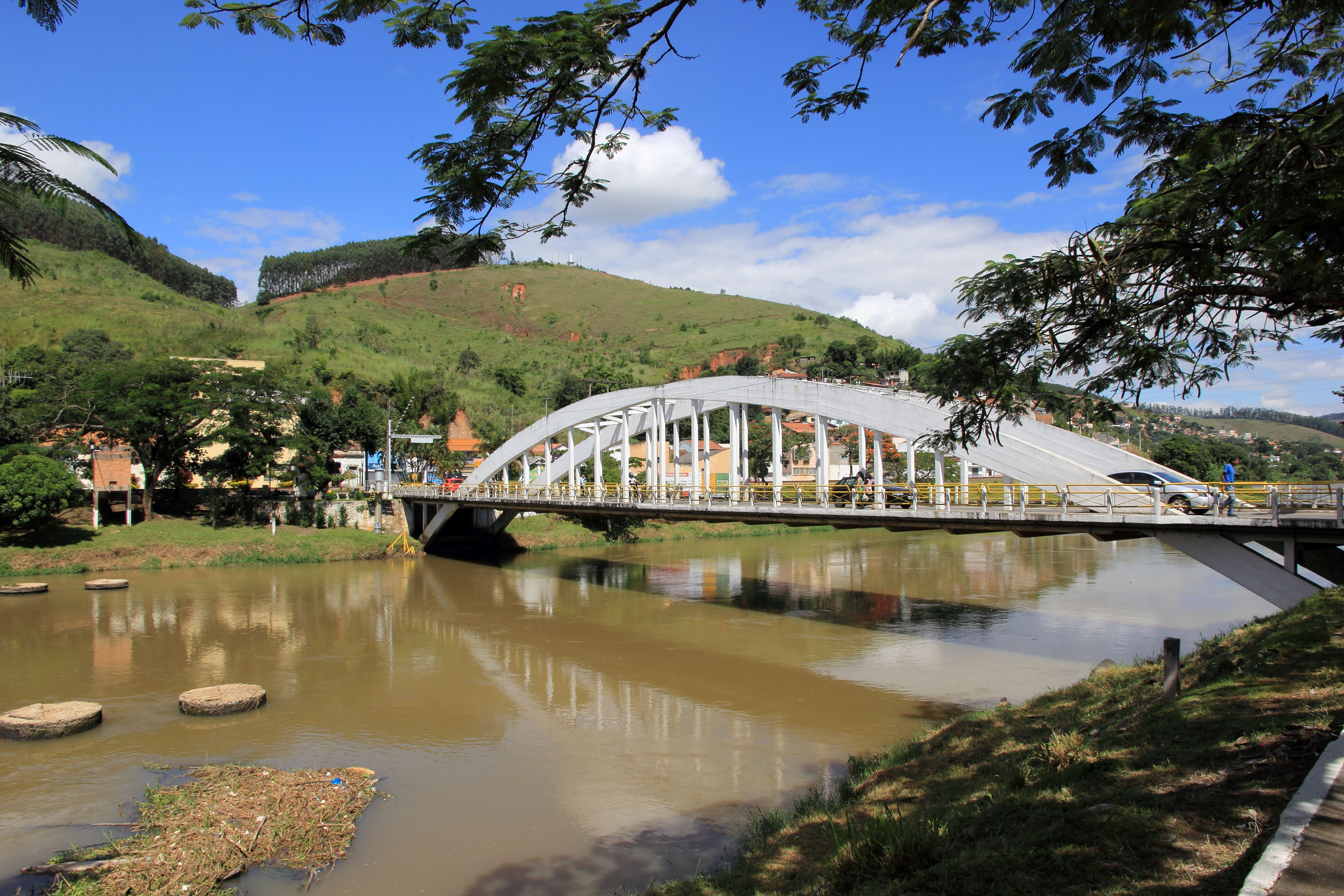
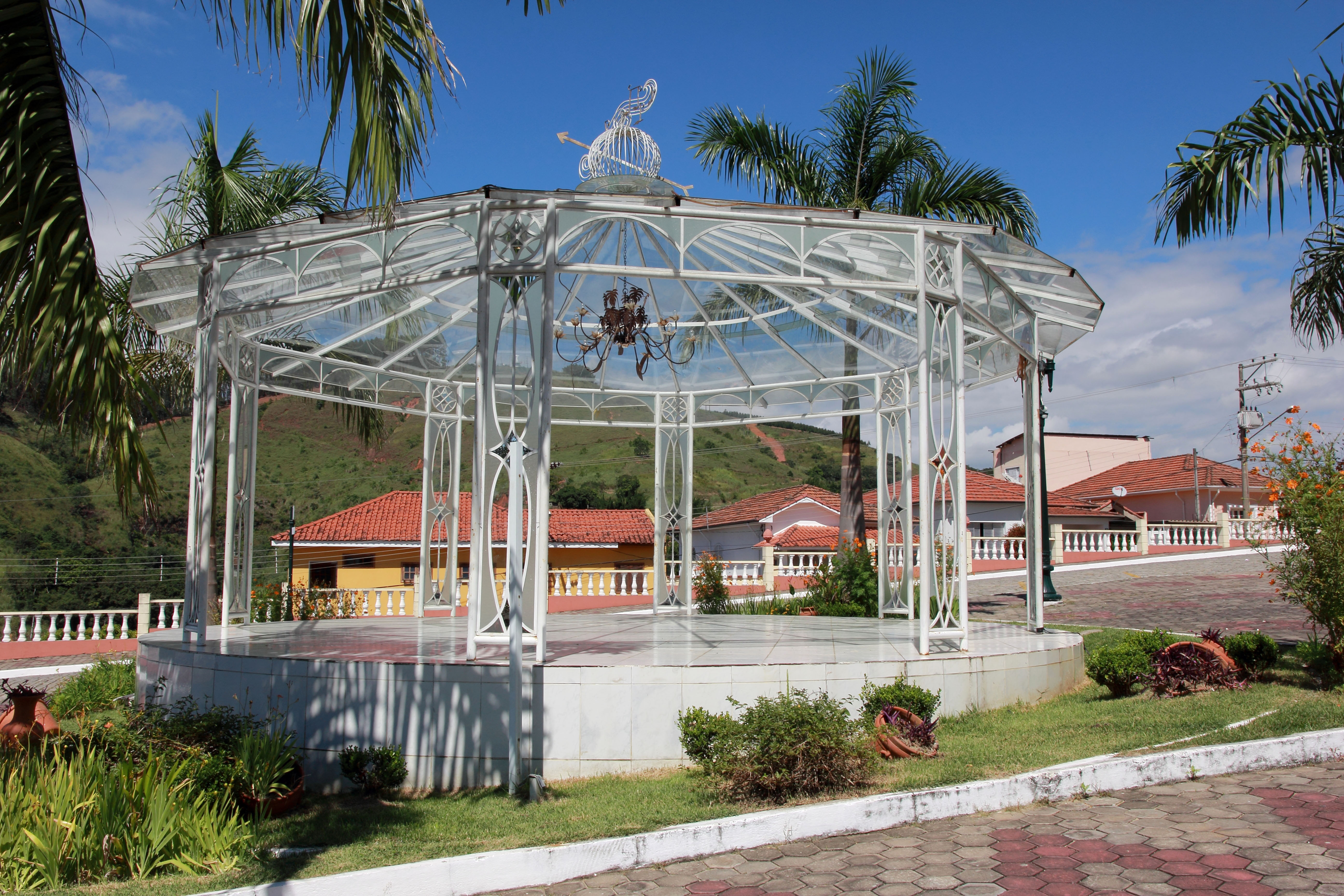
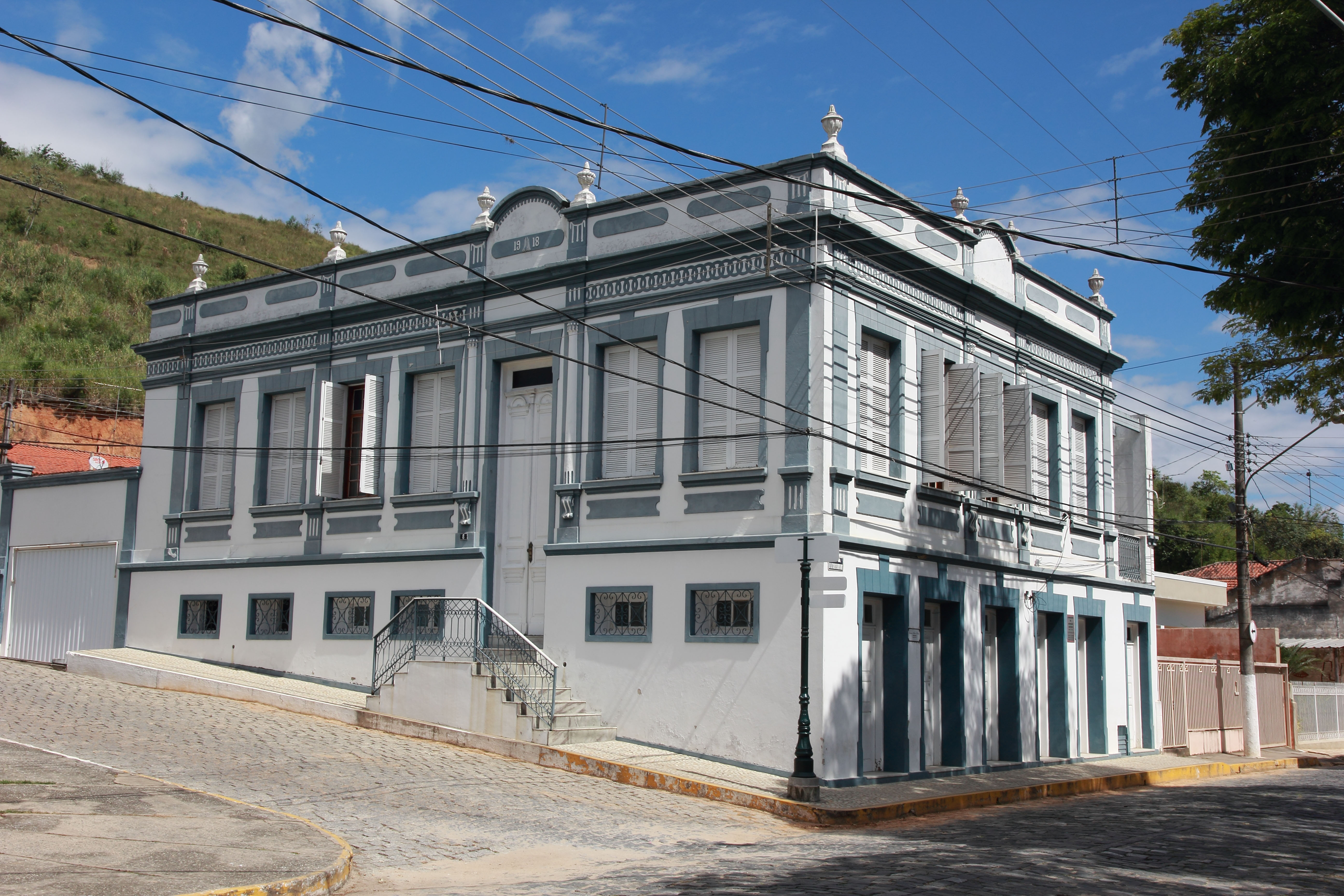

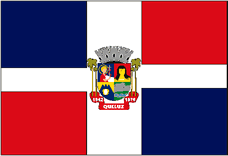
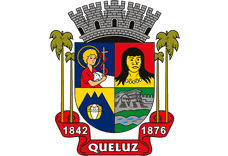
- Flag Coat of arms

- Location in São Paulo
- Coordinates: 22°32′14″S 44°46′27″W
- Country: Brazil
- Region: Southeast
- State: São Paulo
- Metrop. region: Vale do Paraíba e Litoral Norte

Area
  - Total: 249.83 km^{2} (96.46 sq mi)

Population (2020)
  - Total: 13,606
  - Density: 54.461/km^{2} (141.05/sq mi)
- Time zone: UTC−3 (BRT)
- Postal code: 12800-xxx
- Area code: +55 12
- HDI (2010): 0.722 – high
- Website: queluz.sp.gov.br

Queluz is a municipality in the state of São Paulo in Brazil. It is part of the Metropolitan Region of Vale do Paraíba e Litoral Norte.

== Geography ==
The municipality contains part of the 292,000-hectare (720,000-acre) Mananciais do Rio Paraíba do Sul Environmental Protection Area, created in 1982 to protect the sources of the Paraíba do Sul river. The northeast boundary is shared with two other states, Minas Gerais to the north and Rio de Janeiro to the east.

=== Climate ===
The climate of Queluz is tropical, the year-round average low temperature is 16 degrees Celsius, and the average high temperature is 26 degrees Celsius.

== History ==
The city came from a village of Puri Indians in the year of 1800. The village grew up around a chapel built by Indians and slaves under the leadership of father Francisco das Chagas Lima, who was sent to evangelize the Puri people, where he stands today is the Mother Church. The city was incorporated in 1876. The patron saint of Queluz is St. John the Baptist, and the name Queluz is a tribute to the Imperial Family, sharing the name of the town where D. Pedro I was born. Coffee culture is important to the municipality, as farms still exist in the surrounding countryside of Sertão, São José, Restauração, Bela Aurora, Regato, Cascata, etc.

In 2020, the population was estimated as 13,606 people living in an area of 249.4 km^{2} (96.3 sq mi).

== Population history ==
Historical population
Year	Pop.	±%
2000	9,112	—
2004	9,543	+4.7%
2006	10,148	+6.3%
2015	12,600	+24.2%

== Economy ==
The economic development of the municipality is related to farming and the production of toys from wood, leather, and embroidery. The secondary sector have contributed significantly to the region's economic development. The presence in the region of Brazil's main steel producer, the Companhia Siderurgica Nacional (CSN) is advantageous to industry in the region, such as the Volkswagen truck factory in Resende, 32 km from Queluz, and the Peugeot factory in Resende. Industries established in Queluz are exempt from municipal taxes for ten years; the council also supports negotiations with state and federal governments to reduce other taxes. To encourage the development of new industries, the mayor can donate land with infrastructure already available.

== Media ==
In telecommunications, the city was served by Companhia Telefônica Brasileira until 1973, when it began to be served by Telecomunicações de São Paulo. In July 1998, this company was acquired by Telefónica, which adopted the Vivo brand in 2012.

The company is currently an operator of cell phones, fixed lines, internet (fiber optics/4G) and television (satellite and cable).
