= Redenção da Serra =

- Municipality
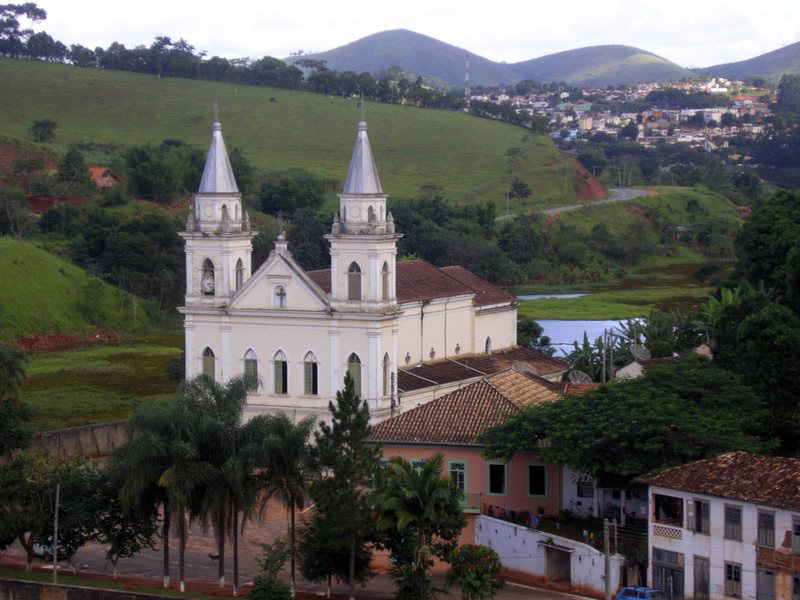

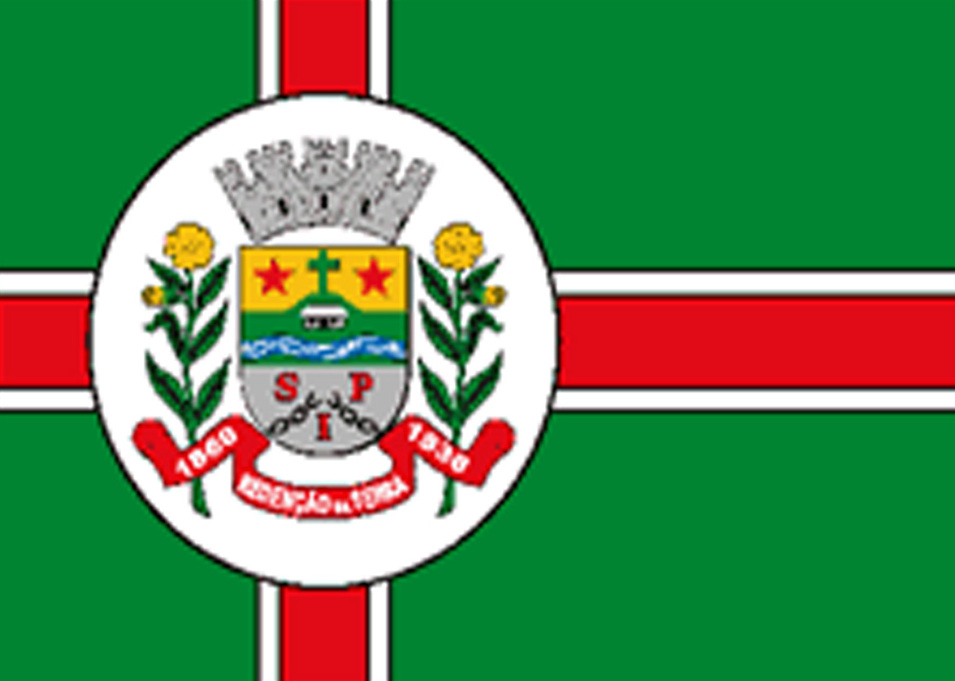
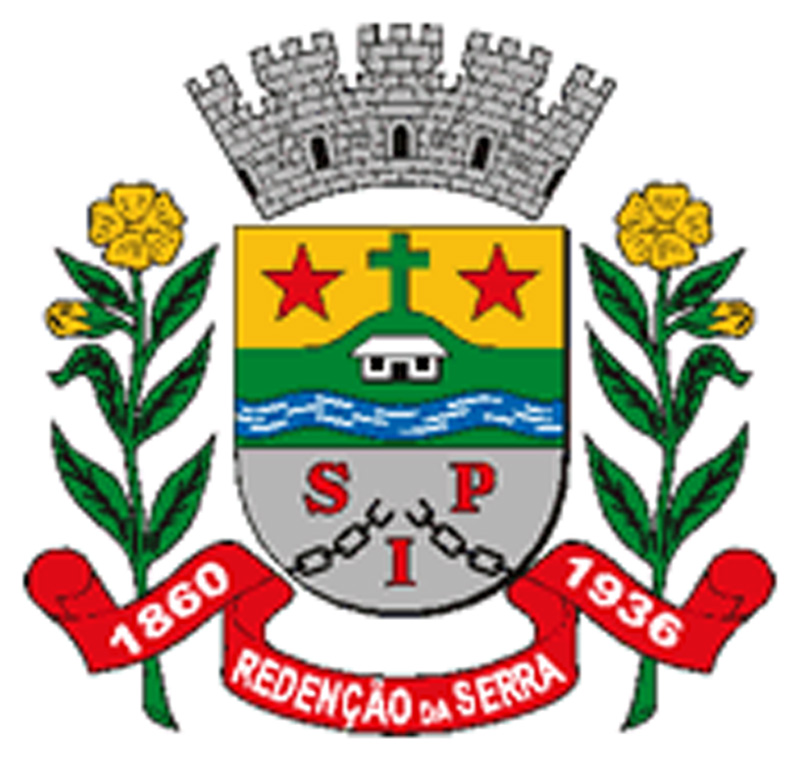
- Flag Coat of arms

- Location in São Paulo state

- Location in Brazil
- Coordinates: 23°16′1″S 45°32′12″W
- Country: Brazil
- Region: Southeast
- State: São Paulo
- Metrop. region: Vale do Paraíba e Litoral Norte

Area
  - Total: 309.44 km^{2} (119.48 sq mi)
- Elevation: 730 m (2,400 ft)

Population (2020)
  - Total: 3,839
  - Density: 12.41/km^{2} (32.13/sq mi)
- Time zone: UTC−3 (BRT)
- Postal code: 12170-xxx
- Area code: +55-12
- Website: www.redencaodaserra.sp.gov.br

Redenção da Serra (Portuguese for Redemption of the mountains) is a municipality (município) in the eastern part of the state of São Paulo in Brazil. It is part of the Metropolitan Region of Vale do Paraíba e Litoral Norte. The population is 3,839 (2020 est.) in an area of 309.44 km^{2}. The elevation is 730 m.

The municipality contains part of the 292,000-hectare (720,000-acre) Mananciais do Rio Paraíba do Sul Environmental Protection Area, created in 1982 to protect the sources of the Paraíba do Sul river.

== History ==
The modern history of Redenção da Serra goes back to the start of the nineteenth century. As the gold mines of Minas Gerais became depleted the focus of the Brazilian economy shifted towards the Paraíba Valley and the production of coffee. The growth of the coffee monoculture drove rapid economic growth, leading to expansion and prosperity for a number of urban centers such as Taubaté, Pindamonhangaba, Guaratinguetá, Lorena and Bananal.

== Media ==
In telecommunications, the city was served by Companhia de Telecomunicações do Estado de São Paulo until 1973, when it began to be served by Telecomunicações de São Paulo. In July 1998, this company was acquired by Telefónica, which adopted the Vivo brand in 2012.

The company is currently an operator of cell phones, fixed lines, internet (fiber optics/4G) and television (satellite and cable).

== See also ==
- List of municipalities in São Paulo
