= Natividade da Serra =

- Municipality
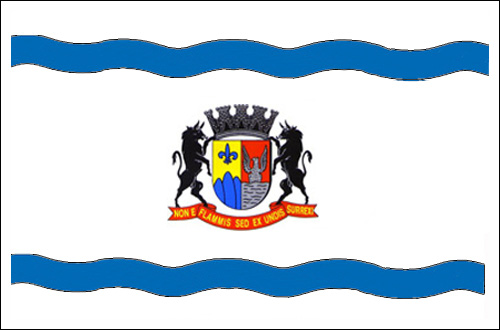
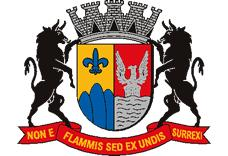
- Flag Coat of arms

- Location in São Paulo state

- Location in Brazil
- Coordinates: 23°22′32″S 45°26′31″W
- Country: Brazil
- Region: Southeast
- State: São Paulo
- Metrop. region: Vale do Paraíba e Litoral Norte

Area
  - Total: 833.37 km^{2} (321.77 sq mi)

Population (2020)
  - Total: 6,642
  - Density: 7.970/km^{2} (20.64/sq mi)
- Time zone: UTC−3 (BRT)
- Postal code: 12180-xxx
- Area code: +55-12
- Website: www.natividadedaserra.sp.gov.br

Natividade da Serra (meaning "the nativity of the mountain") is a municipality in the state of São Paulo in Brazil. It is part of the Metropolitan Region of Vale do Paraíba e Litoral Norte. The population is 6,642 (2020 est.) in an area of 833.37 km^{2}. The elevation is 720 m. The southern part is heavily forested and mountainous and there are few roads and tracks into the mountain. The hills and some mountains with farmlands dominate the rest of the municipality.

The municipality contains part of the 292,000-hectare (720,000-acre) Mananciais do Rio Paraíba do Sul Environmental Protection Area, created in 1982 to protect the sources of the Paraíba do Sul river.

== Media ==
In telecommunications, the city was served by Companhia de Telecomunicações do Estado de São Paulo until 1973, when it began to be served by Telecomunicações de São Paulo. In July 1998, this company was acquired by Telefónica, which adopted the Vivo brand in 2012.

The company is currently an operator of cell phones, fixed lines, internet (fiber optics/4G) and television (satellite and cable).

== See also ==
- List of municipalities in São Paulo
