= São José do Barreiro =

- Municipality
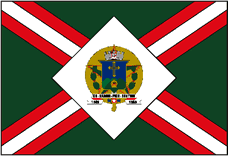
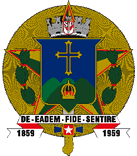
- Flag Coat of arms

- Location in São Paulo state

- Location in Brazil
- Coordinates: 22°38′41″S 44°34′40″W
- Country: Brazil
- Region: Southeast
- State: São Paulo
- Microregion: Bananal
- Metrop. region: Vale do Paraíba e Litoral Norte

Area
  - Total: 570.69 km^{2} (220.34 sq mi)

Population (2020)
  - Total: 4,144
  - Density: 7.261/km^{2} (18.81/sq mi)
- Time zone: UTC−3 (BRT)
- Postal code: 12510-xxx
- Area code: +55-16
- Website: www.saojosedobarreiro.sp.gov.br

São José do Barreiro (São José in Portuguese means Saint Joseph) is a municipality in the eastern part of the state of São Paulo, Brazil. The population is 4,144 (2020 est.) in an area of 570.69 km^{2}.

== Geography ==
São José do Barreiro is in the microregion of Bananal. Both to the north and south it borders the state of Rio de Janeiro. It is part of the Metropolitan Region of Vale do Paraíba e Litoral Norte. The municipality contains part of the 292,000-hectare (720,000-acre) Mananciais do Rio Paraíba do Sul Environmental Protection Area, created in 1982 to protect the sources of the Paraíba do Sul river. The southern part of the municipality is part of the Serra da Bocaina National Park. Its main industries are cattle and tourism.

== Population history ==
Historical population
Year	Pop.	±%
2003	4,208	—
2004	4,251	+1.0%
2015	4,185	−1.6%

== Media ==
In telecommunications, the city was served by Companhia Telefônica Brasileira until 1973, when it began to be served by Telecomunicações de São Paulo. In July 1998, this company was acquired by Telefónica, which adopted the Vivo brand in 2012.

The company is currently an operator of cell phones, fixed lines, internet (fiber optics/4G) and television (satellite and cable).

== See also ==
- List of municipalities in São Paulo
