= Alê (footballer, born 1990) =

Brazilian footballer (born 1990)

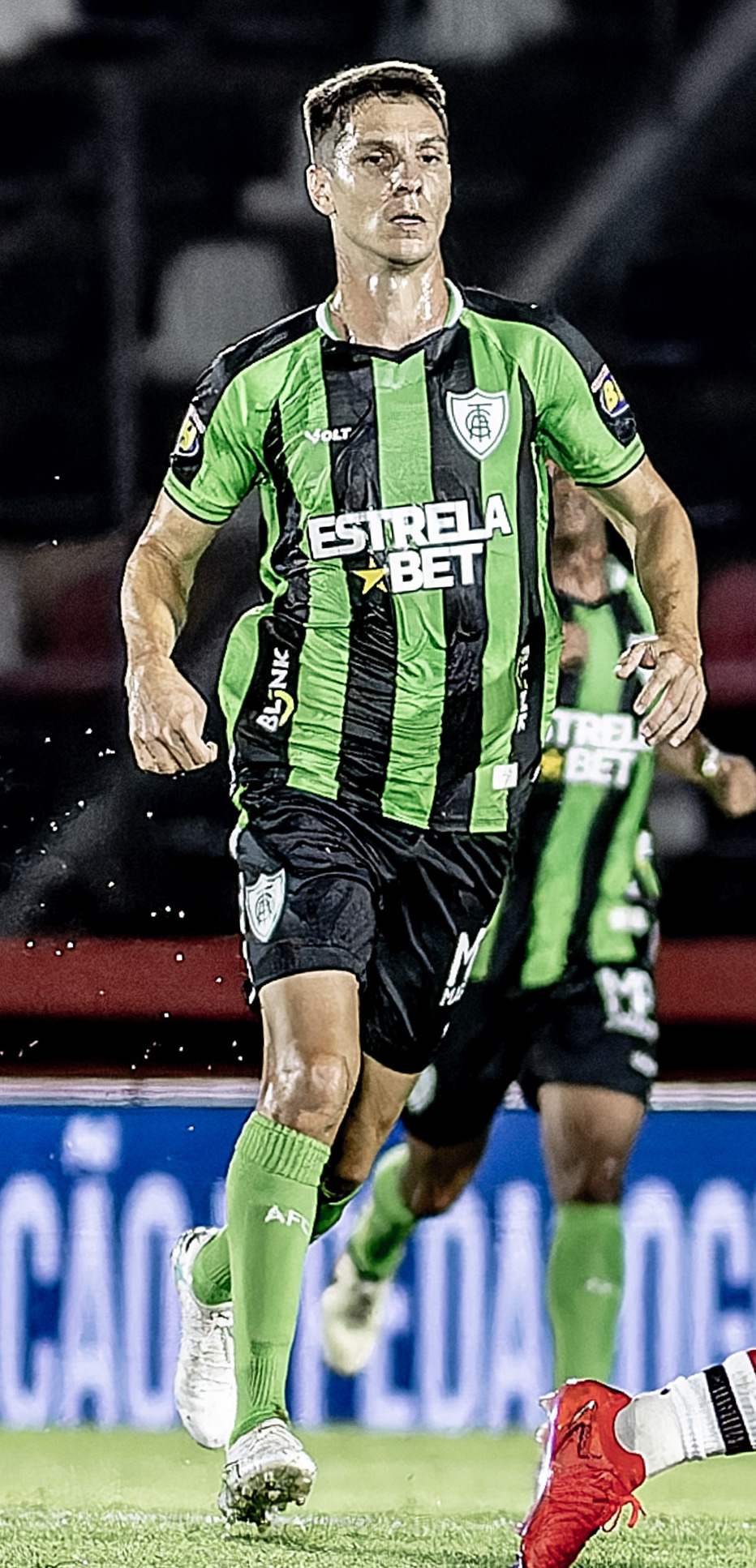
- Alê in action for América Mineiro in 2024

Personal information
- Full name: Alexandre Egea
- Date of birth: 6 June 1990 (age 36)
- Place of birth: Osasco, Brazil
- Height: 1.84 m (6 ft 0 in)
- Position: Defensive midfielder

Team information
- Current team: América Mineiro
- Number: 16

Youth career
- 1997–2004: Corinthians
- 2006–2009: Primeira Camisa

Senior career*
| Years | Team | Apps | (Gls) |
| 2010–2012 | Primeira Camisa | 27 | (6) |
| 2011 | → Inter de Limeira (loan) | 1 | (0) |
| 2011–2012 | → Taubaté (loan) | 2 | (0) |
| 2012 | Osasco | 17 | (4) |
| 2013 | Grêmio Osasco | 9 | (1) |
| 2013 | → Grêmio Barueri (loan) | 1 | (0) |
| 2014 | Audax Rio | 6 | (0) |
| 2015–2018 | Uberlândia | 45 | (5) |
| 2015 | → Coimbra (loan) | 7 | (2) |
| 2016 | → URT (loan) | 4 | (0) |
| 2017 | → Caldense (loan) | 5 | (0) |
| 2017 | → Cuiabá (loan) | 10 | (0) |
| 2018–2019 | Cuiabá | 58 | (8) |
| 2020– | América Mineiro | 213 | (19) |
- * Club domestic league appearances and goals as of 18 November 2026

Alexandre Egea (born 6 June 1990), commonly known as Alê, is a Brazilian footballer who plays as a defensive midfielder for América Mineiro.

== Club career ==
Born in Osasco, São Paulo, Alê represented Corinthians and Primeira Camisa as a youth. He made his senior debut with the latter's first team on 1 May 2010, starting in a 5–2 Campeonato Paulista Segunda Divisão home routing of Joseense.

Alê scored his first senior goal on 10 July 2010, netting the last of a 3–0 home success over União Suzano. On 15 December, he signed for Inter de Limeira on loan for the ensuing Campeonato Paulista Série A3, but was released the following 14 February after playing only one match.

On 2 September 2011, after returning to his parent club, Alê moved to Taubaté for the Copa Paulista, but featured sparingly. In 2012 he signed for Osasco, being an important unit for the side before moving to neighbouring Grêmio Osasco.

In December 2013, after a short loan period at Série C side Grêmio Barueri, Alê was announced in the squad of Grêmio Osasco's affiliate club Audax Rio. After featuring rarely, he was released, and joined Uberlândia for the 2015 campaign.

After helping Uberlândia win the Campeonato Mineiro Módulo II, Alê served temporary deals at Coimbra, URT, Caldense and Cuiabá. Back to the club for the 2018 season, he impressed during the year's Campeonato Mineiro, and returned to Cuiabá on 20 April 2018, now in a permanent deal.

During his first season, Alê was a regular starter as his side achieved promotion to Série B. In his second, he remained a starter as his side lifted the Campeonato Matogrossense and the Copa Verde.

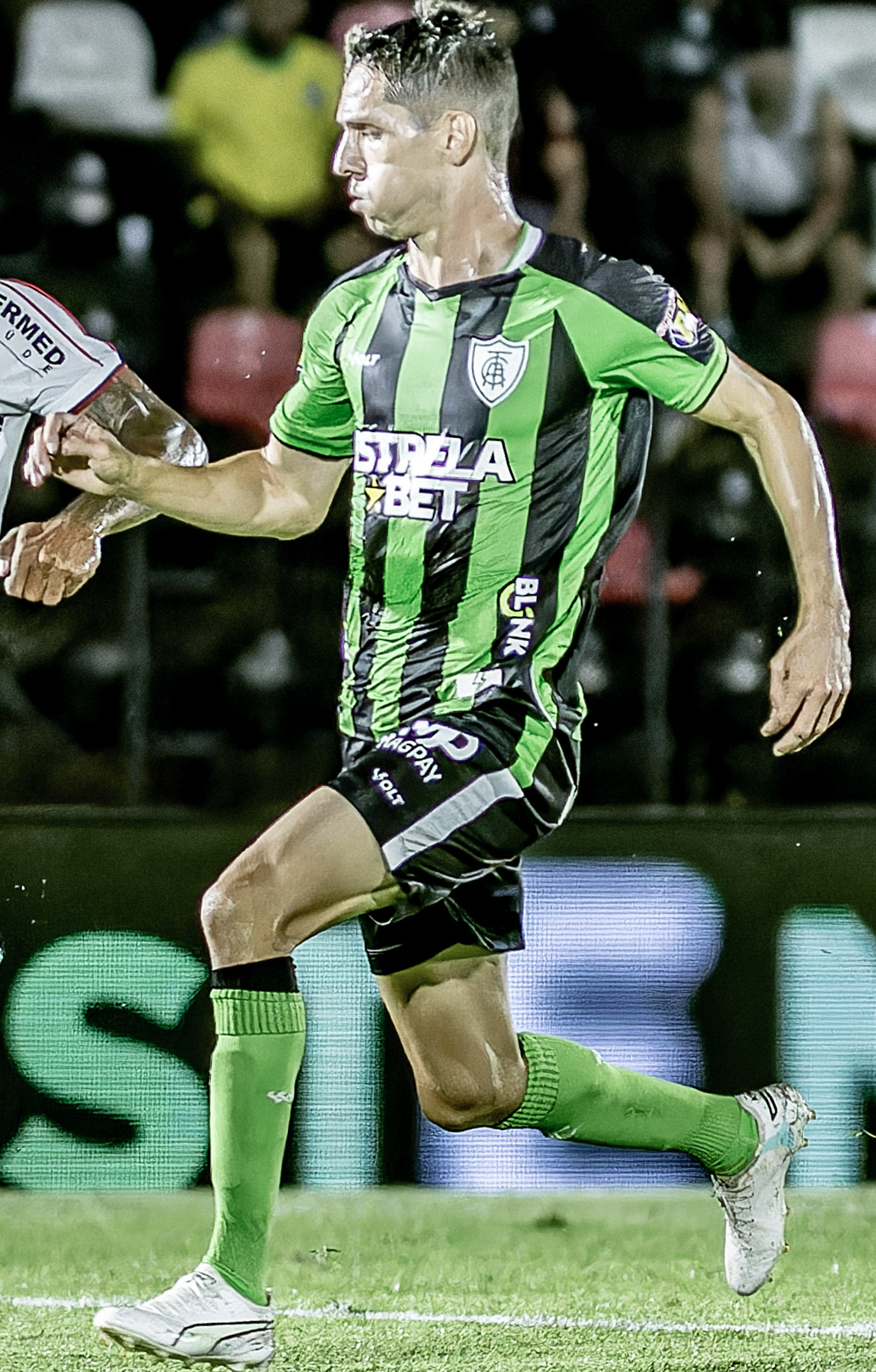
Alê playing for América Mineiro in 2024

On 10 December 2019, Alê agreed to a one-year contract with América Mineiro, still in the second division.

== Career statistics ==
As of 2 March 2023

| Club | Season | League | | | State League | | Cup | | Continental | | Other | | Total | |
| Club | Season | Division | Apps | Goals | Apps | Goals | Apps | Goals | Apps | Goals | Apps | Goals | Apps | Goals |
|---|---|---|---|---|---|---|---|---|---|---|---|---|---|---|
| Primeira Camisa | 2010 | Paulista 2ª Divisão | — | | 11 | 1 | — | | — | | — | | 11 | 1 |
| Primeira Camisa | 2011 | Paulista 2ª Divisão | — | | 16 | 5 | — | | — | | — | | 16 | 5 |
| Primeira Camisa | Subtotal | | — | | 27 | 6 | — | | — | | — | | 27 | 6 |
| Inter de Limeira (loan) | 2011 | Paulista A3 | — | | 1 | 0 | — | | — | | — | | 1 | 0 |
| Taubaté (loan) | 2011 | Paulista A3 | — | | 0 | 0 | — | | — | | 6 (Note: Appearance(s) in Copa Paulista) | 1 | 6 | 1 |
| Taubaté (loan) | 2012 | Paulista A3 | — | | 2 | 0 | — | | — | | — | | 2 | 0 |
| Taubaté (loan) | Subtotal | | — | | 2 | 0 | — | | — | | 6 | 1 | 8 | 1 |
| Osasco | 2012 | Paulista 2ª Divisão | — | | 17 | 4 | — | | — | | — | | 17 | 4 |
| Grêmio Osasco | 2013 | Paulista A2 | — | | 9 | 1 | — | | — | | 5 | 0 | 14 | 1 |
| Grêmio Barueri (loan) | 2013 | Série C | 1 | 0 | — | | — | | — | | — | | 1 | 0 |
| Audax Rio | 2014 | Carioca | — | | 6 | 0 | — | | — | | — | | 6 | 0 |
| Uberlândia | 2015 | Mineiro Módulo II | — | | 18 | 1 | — | | — | | — | | 18 | 1 |
| Uberlândia | 2016 | Mineiro | — | | 6 | 0 | — | | — | | — | | 6 | 0 |
| Uberlândia | 2017 | Mineiro | — | | 10 | 0 | — | | — | | — | | 10 | 0 |
| Uberlândia | 2018 | Série D | 0 | 0 | 9 | 4 | 2 | 0 | — | | — | | 11 | 4 |
| Uberlândia | Subtotal | | 0 | 0 | 43 | 5 | 2 | 0 | — | | — | | 45 | 5 |
| Coimbra (loan) | 2015 | Mineiro 2ª Divisão | — | | 7 | 2 | — | | — | | — | | 7 | 2 |
| URT (loan) | 2016 | Série D | 4 | 0 | — | | — | | — | | — | | 4 | 0 |
| Caldense (loan) | 2017 | Série D | 5 | 0 | — | | — | | — | | — | | 5 | 0 |
| Cuiabá (loan) | 2017 | Série C | 10 | 0 | — | | — | | — | | — | | 10 | 0 |
| Cuiabá | 2018 | Série C | 16 | 3 | — | | — | | — | | — | | 16 | 3 |
| Cuiabá | 2019 | Série B | 29 | 3 | 13 | 2 | 2 | 0 | — | | 3 (Note: Appearance(s) in Copa Verde) | 0 | 47 | 4 |
| Cuiabá | Subtotal | | 45 | 6 | 13 | 2 | 2 | 0 | — | | 3 | 0 | 63 | 8 |
| América Mineiro | 2020 | Série B | 33 | 0 | 12 | 3 | 10 | 1 | — | | — | | 55 | 4 |
| América Mineiro | 2021 | Série A | 28 | 3 | 15 | 2 | 4 | 0 | — | | — | | 47 | 4 |
| América Mineiro | 2022 | Série A | 28 | 2 | 5 | 2 | 3 | 1 | 7 (Note: Appearance(s) in Copa Libertadores) | 0 | — | | 43 | 5 |
| América Mineiro | 2023 | Série A | 0 | 0 | 6 | 0 | 1 | 0 | — | | — | | 7 | 0 |
| América Mineiro | Subtotal | | 89 | 5 | 38 | 7 | 18 | 1 | 7 | 0 | — | | 152 | 14 |
| Career total | | | 154 | 11 | 163 | 27 | 22 | 2 | 7 | 0 | 14 | 1 | 360 | 41 |

== Honours ==
Uberlândia

- Campeonato Mineiro Módulo II: 2015

Cuiabá

- Copa Verde: 2019
- Campeonato Matogrossense: 2019
