= Romildo Del Piage =

Brazilian footballer

Del Piage
Personal information
- Full name: Romildo Del Piage de Souza
- Date of birth: 12 April 2000 (age 26)
- Place of birth: São José dos Campos, Brazil
- Height: 1.81 m (5 ft 11 in)
- Position: Midfielder

Team information
- Current team: Avaí
- Number: 5

Youth career
- 2017–2020: Joseense
- 2017–2019: → Palmeiras (loan)
- 2019–2020: → Botafogo (loan)

Senior career*
Years	Team	Apps	(Gls)
2019–2021	Joseense	4	(0)
2021	→ Botafogo (loan)	4	(0)
2021–2023	Botafogo	33	(2)
2023–2025	RWD Molenbeek	29	(1)
2025–	Avaí	11	(1)
- * Club domestic league appearances and goals as of 18 November 2026

Romildo Del Piage de Souza (born 12 April 2000), known as Del Piage or just Romildo, is a Brazilian footballer who plays as a midfielder for Avaí.

== Club career ==
Del Piage was born in São José dos Campos, São Paulo, and began his career with hometown side São José dos Campos FC. He moved to Palmeiras in 2017, He returned from loan in July 2019, with the club now called Joseense, and played in four first team matches in the Campeonato Paulista Segunda Divisão before joining Botafogo on 13 September.

Del Piage made his first team – and Série A – debut for Bota on 10 January 2021, starting in a 0–3 away loss against Vasco da Gama. In March, he signed a permanent deal with the club, until the end of 2023.

Del Piage scored his first professional goal on 24 July 2021, netting the winner in a 1–0 Série B away success over Confiança.

Del Piage joined RWD Molenbeek on 31 January 2023. He scored his first goal for his new club on 11 November 2023 against Eupen in a 3-1 away success in Belgian First Division A.

== Career statistics ==
As of 10 April 2022.

Club	Season	League			State League		Cup		Continental		Other		Total	
Club	Season	Division	Apps	Goals	Apps	Goals	Apps	Goals	Apps	Goals	Apps	Goals	Apps	Goals
Joseense	2019	Paulista 2ª Divisão	—		4	0	—		—		—		4	0
Botafogo	2020	Série A	4	0	0	0	0	0	—		—		4	0
Botafogo	2021	Série B	6	1	4	0	0	0	—		—		10	1
Botafogo	2022	Série A	1	0	4	0	0	0	—		—		5	0
Botafogo	Total		11	1	8	0	0	0	—		—		19	1
Career total			11	1	12	0	0	0	0	0	0	0	23	1

== Honours ==
Botafogo

- Campeonato Brasileiro Série B: 2021
