= Jalkanen =

Jalkanen is a Finnish surname. Notable people with the surname include:

- Kustaa Jalkanen (1862–1921), Finnish farmer and politician
- Kalle Jalkanen (1907–1941), Finnish cross-country skier
- Kauko Jalkanen (1918–2007), Finnish fencer
- Timo Jalkanen (born 1936), Finnish diplomat and jurist
- Kari Tapio (1945–2010; birth name Kari Tapani Jalkanen), Finnish singer
- Markku Jalkanen (born 1954), Finnish scientist, biotech entrepreneur and businessman
- Sirpa Jalkanen (born 1954), Finnish scientist, working in the field of biomedical and clinical medicine
- Karl James Jalkanen (born 1958), researcher
- Ilja Jalkanen, Finnish vocalist for Kiuas

== Meaning ==
The prefix Jalka generally means "foot," but also can refer to the leg of a stool or an animal's paw. Jalka- thus has a loose meaning, and when the prefix is added to the common -nen Finnish name ending it loses its colloquial meaning. Like most Finnish names, whether Jalkanen has a formal meaning is ambiguous. Generally, Finnish surnames do not have the same meaning schemes as other European names. If Finnish names were used to indicate a family's original trade (as with English and German names, like Miller, Shoemaker, Brewer, Smith, etc.) then the term "foot" or "Jalka" could refer to a profession such as a cobbler or tracker.
