= Estádio ADC Parahyba =

Multi-use stadium in São José dos Campos, Brazil

Coordinates: 23°9′49.34″S 45°53′23.82″W

- Tecelagem
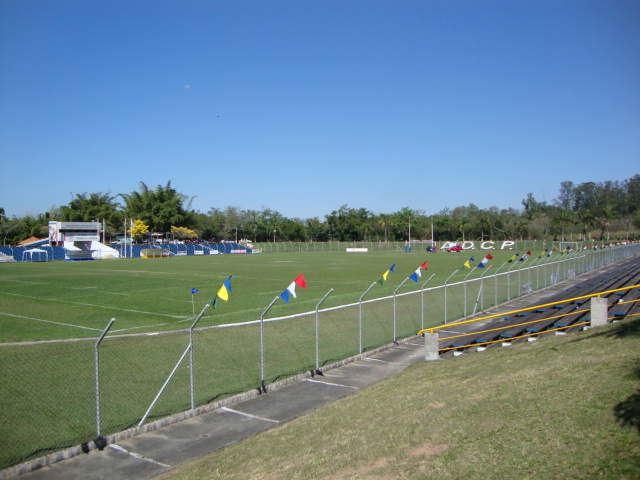
- Interactive map of Estádio ADC Parahyba
- Location: São José dos Campos, São Paulo state, Brazil
- Owner: ADC Parahyba
- Operator: ADC Parahyba
- Capacity: 2,500
- Surface: Natural grass
- Field size: 105 by 68 metres (114.8 yd × 74.4 yd)

Tenants
- Clube Atlético Joseense; Futebol Clube Primeira Camisa

Estádio ADC Parahyba is a multi-use stadium located in São José dos Campos, Brazil. It is used mostly for football matches and hosts the home matches of Clube Atlético Joseense and Futebol Clube Primeira Camisa. The stadium has a maximum capacity of 2,500 people.
