= Hermann Hartmann =

German chemist (1914–1984)

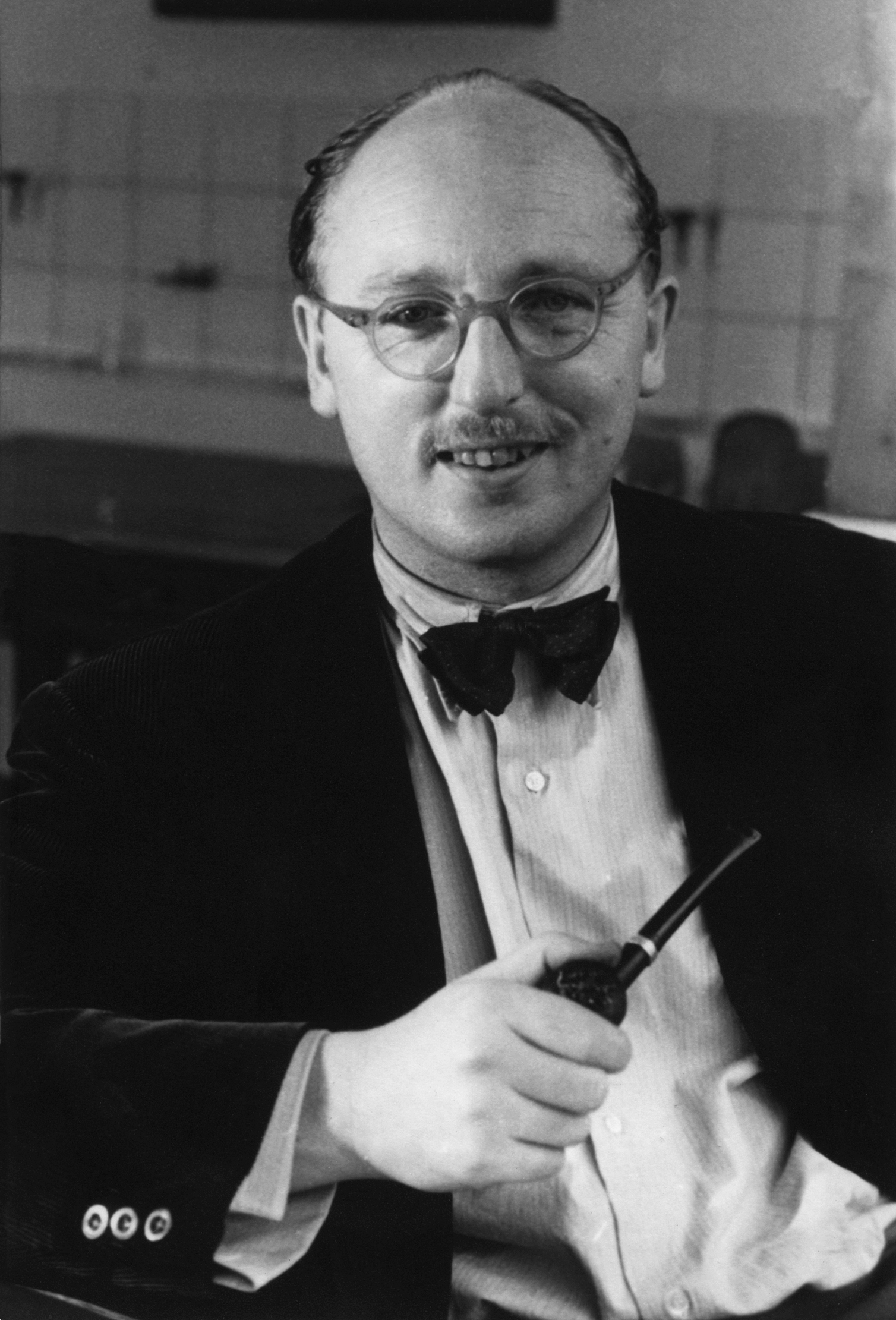
Hermann Hartmann in 1950

Hermann Hartmann (4 May 1914 in Bischofsheim an der Rhön – 22 October 1984 in Glashütten im Taunus) was a German chemist and professor and researcher in physical and theoretical chemistry at the University of Frankfurt am Main. He contributed to all fields of physical chemistry and was instrumental in establishing theoretical chemistry by developing Ligand field theory (1947) and other quantum chemical models including the Hartmann Potential (1971). He also formulated a new perturbation theory (1970–1977) as part of his pioneering research towards a unified field theory of chemical bonding based on a non-linear Schrödinger equation (1980).

== Biography ==
=== 1933–1952 ===
In 1933 H. Hartmann started the study of chemistry in Munich, where he got strongly influenced and supported by Arnold Sommerfeld. 1939 he continued his studies in Frankfurt where he received his PhD 1941. In 1943 he habilitated on the applications of the Hückel theory. 1946 he became Docent in Frankfurt. Together with F. Ilse, his first student, he developed Ligand field theory a mayor advance in the understanding of complex compounds. In 1951 he became leader of a division in the Max-Planck-Institute for Physical Chemistry in Göttingen but returned to Frankfurt a year later.

=== 1952–1962 ===
1952 Hartmann was appointed as Director of the Institute of Physical Chemistry at the University of Frankfurt. His research covered all areas of physical and theoretical chemistry. In his spectroscopic studies he applied all available techniques from x-ray, optical, infrared, microwave, NMR to mass spectrometry. His investigations of kinetic processes include reactions with peptides, organic radicals as well as studied on the influence of pressure and solvation. In his theoretical work Hartmann emphasis on exact solvable models (model quantum chemistry) rather than numerical ab initio calculations . His main book „Quantum mechanical theory of chemical bonding“ ( "Theorie der chemischen Bindung auf quantentheoretischer Grundlage") appeared 1954. Through his publications and lectures he influenced considerably the development of quantum chemistry in Germany.

=== 1962–1972 ===
Through the support of the German Research Foundation (DFG) in the early 60th Hartmann could expand his group of researchers. Among the 20 theoreticists and about 100 scientists working and teaching at Hartmann's Institute were H. L. Schläfer, G. Gliemann, H. Sillescu, G.H. Kohlmeier, K. Helfrich, E. A. Reinsch, H. v. Hirschhausen, K. Jug, J. Heidberg, H. Heydmann, H. Kelm, H. W. Spiess.

With the support of his group Hartmann focused on getting students interested in theoretical chemistry by arranging regular summer schools in theoretical chemistry held mostly at Konstanz/Bodensee.

1962 Hartmann started Theoretica Chimica Acta a peer-reviewed scientific journal publishing original research and review articles in theoretical chemistry. Articles could be submitted in English, German, French and also Latin, but only one article was ever written in Latin. 1984 shortly before his death Hartmann turned the editorship over to K. Ruedenberg, Iowa State University. After Ruedenberg's retirement 1997, the name of Theoretica Chimica Acta (TCA) was broadened to Theoretical Chemistry Accounts: Theory, Computation, and Modeling, still keeping its initials TCA, with the new editor Donald G. Truhlar, University of Minnesota. TCA documents the growth of the field of theoretical chemistry and contributed significantly to the progress of theoretical chemistry in Germany.

1965 Hartmann organized the first Theoretical Chemistry Symposia ( "Symposium für Theoretische Chemie"). The initial goal of the annual meetings was to provide a regular platform for theoreticians from Germany, Austria, and Switzerland to meet with experimentalist. In the organization committee Hartmann was supported by H. Labhart (Zürich), and 0.E. Polansky (Vienna) – to which at a later time W.A. Bingel (Göttingen), E. Ruch (Berlin), G. Wagniere (Zürich), and P. Schuster (Vienna) were added. Since 1992 the symposium organizer is selected by the Arbeitsgemeinschaft Theoretische Chemie (AGTC), founded to give this field a more official status in concert with the established professional organizations of chemistry, physical chemistry, and physics. The symposium is since then the annual meeting for theoretical chemists from the German speaking countries The location of these meetings varies in the series between Germany-Switzerland-Germany-Austria.

Through all the efforts initiated by H. Hartmann theoretical chemistry started to influence not only chemical research in Germany but slowly became an independent field for which new professorships were created at universities.

=== 1972–1984 ===
In the 70th experimental research at the Hartmann Institute of physical chemistry focused on ion-molecule reactions using ion-cyclotron resonance spectroscopy with K.-P. Wanczek as leading researcher who 1976 became professor at the University of Bremen. The theoretical foundations of this research were developed in collaboration with K.-M.. Chung, M. W. Morsy, and D. Schuch theoretical physicists working at Hartmann's Institute for Theoretical Chemistry. Since 1973 H. Hartmann also had a small research institute at his place of living in Glashütten (Taunus) supported by the Mainzer Akademie der Wissenschaften und Literatur. Together with K.-M. Chung, D. Schuch, W. Ulmer and B. Zeiger a unified understanding of molecular interactions was developed based on a nonlinear Schrödinger equation. Hartmann thereby pioneered the discovery of one self-interacting field as the foundation of chemistry. H. Hartman emerited in 1982 and died two years later.

H. Hartmann was honoured as member of the Deutsche Akademie der Naturforscher Leopoldina, the Gesellschaft Österreichischer Chemiker, the Accademia Nazionale die Lincei, the Royal Danish Academy of Sciences and Letters, the Comitato Premio of Fondazione Balzan, the International Academy of Quantum Molecular Science, and the Akademie der Wissenschaften und der Literatur zu Mainz.

== Publications ==
- H. Hartmann: Theorie der chemischen Bindung auf quantentheoretischer Grundlage, Springer, Berlin (1954)
- H. Hartmann: Die chemische Bindung : Drei Vorlesungen für Chemiker, Springer, Berlin (1955), (1964), (1971)
- H. Hartmann: Über ein mechanisches Modell zur Analyse und Darstellung typisch quantentheoretischer Erscheinungen, Bayer. Akademie d. Wissenschaften, München (1957)
- H. Hartmann: Die Bedeutung quantentheoretischer Modelle für die Chemie, F. Steiner, Wiesbaden (1965)
- H. Hartmann: Die Bedeutung des Vorurteils für den Fortgang der naturwissenschaftlichen Erkenntnis, F. Steiner, Wiesbaden (1967)
- H. Hartmann (Ed.): Chemische Elementarprozesse, Springer, Berlin (1968)
- H. Hartmann: Neue Wellenmechanische Eigenwertprobleme, F. Steiner, Wiesbaden (1972)
- H. Hartmann, K.-H. Lebert and K.-P. Wanczek: Ion cyclotron resonance spectroscopy (Topics in Current Chemistry Volume 43) Springer Berlin (1972)
- H. Hartmann, and K.-P. Wanczek: Ion Cyclotron Resonance Spectrometry, I (Lecture Notes in Chemistry 7) Springer, Berlin (1978)
- H.Hartmann, and K.-P. Wanczek: Ion cyclotron resonance spectrometry. II (Lecture Notes in Chemistry 31), Springer, Berlin (1982)

== External links and references ==
- M. Trömel: Die Frankfurter Gelehrtenrepublik. Neue Folge (Hrsg. G. Böhme), Schulz-Kirchner Verlag, Idstein S. 199–214 (2002)
- Hermann Hartmann and the Theoretical Chemistry in the 20th century (in German)
- Interview with Karl Jug (in German)
- The Development of Computational Chemistry in Germany by Sigrid D. Peyerimhoff
- Biographical data
- http://www.iaqms.org/deceased/hartmann.php

The thinking of Hermann Hartmann is illustrated through the following selected publications from H. Hartmann and his research groups. Symmetry considerations, exactly solvable model potentials and perturbation theory are the three tools applied to typical chemical aspects of molecular behaviour resulting in the discovery of a self-interacting classical field of chemical bonding.

- A. Sommerfeld, H. Hartmann: Künstliche Grenzbedingungen in der Wellenmechanik. Der beschränkte Rotator. Annalen der Physik 37, 333–343 (1940)
- F. E. Ilse: Quantenmechanische Rechnungen über Absorptionsspektren polar aufgebauter anorganischer Komplexe. Universität Frankfurt (1946) Dissertation
- H. Hartmann. Ein einfaches Näherungsverfahren zur quantenmechanischen Behandlung der π-Elektonensysteme aromatischer Kohlenwasserstoffe I & II. Zeitschrift für Naturforschung A, 2a(5) 259- 263 (1947) http://www.znaturforsch.com/aa/c02a.htm
- H. Hartmann: Zur Theorie der Additions- und Umlagerungsreaktionen aromatischer Systeme. Zeitschrift für Naturforschung 3a(1) 29 (1948)
- H. Hartmann, H.L. Schläfer: Über die Absorptionspektren elektrostatischer Komplexionen dreiwertiger Übergangselemente mit oktaedrischer Symmetrie. Zeitschrift für Naturforschung 6a, 760 (1951)
- H. Hartmann: Über ein mechanisches Modell zur Analyse und Darstellung typisch quantentheoretischer Erscheinungen. Verl. d. Bayer. Akademie d. Wissenschaften (1957) Sonderdruck aus den Sitzungsberichten der Bayerische Akademie der Wissenschaften, Mathematisch-Naturwissenschaftliche Klasse (1957)
- H. Hartmann, H.L. Schläfer: Zur Frage der Bindungsverhältnisse in Komplexverbindungen. Angewandte Chemie 70, 155 (1958)
- H. Hartmann. Zur Theorie der π-Elektronensysteme. Zeitschrift für Naturforschung 15a, 993–1003(1960)
- H. Hartmann, E. König: Matrixelemente des Ligandenfeldpotentials in Komplexverbindungen der Übergangsmetalle. Zeitschrift für physikalische Chemie (neue Folge) 28, 425 (1961)
- H. Hartmann: New concepts in the theory of π-electron spectra. Pure and Applied Chemistry 4(1) 15–22 (1962) http://media.iupac.org/publications/pac/1962/pdf/0401x0015.pdf
- H. Hartmann, W. Ilse und G. Gliemann: Das eingeschränkte Fermigas. Theoretica Chimica Acta 1(2) 155–158 (1963)
- H. Sillescu, H. Hartmann: Kernquadrupolkopplung in einigen Kobalt (III)-Komplexen. Theoretica chimica Acta. 2, 371–385 (1964) Dissertation
- H. Hartmann: Die Benzolformel Eine kurze Problemgeschichte. Angewandte Chemie 77 (17–18) 750 – 752 (1965)
- K. Jug: Anwendung einer Einzentrenmethode auf die π-Elektronensysteme von Fünferheterozyklen. Universität Frankfurt (1965) Dissertation
- H. Hartmann, E. Zeeck und A. Ludi: Berechnung von Zuständen komplexer Ionen mit Zentralfeldfunktionen. Theoretica Chimica Acta) 3(2), 182–193 (1965) https://doi.org/10.1007%2FBF00527350
- H.L. Schläfer, G. Gliemann: Einführung in die Ligandenfeldtheorie, Akademische Verlagsgesellschaft, Frankfurt (1968) Book
- H. Hartmann, K. Helfrich: Quantenmechanische Zweizentren-Coulomb-Modelle für Acetylen, Äthylen und Äthan Quantum mechanical two center models for acetylene, ethylene and ethane; Theoretical Chemistry Accounts: Theory, Computation, and Modeling 10(5), 189–198 (1968)
- H. Hartmann, W. Jost. H.G. Wagner: Elementarreaktionen. Zur Problematik reaktionskinetischer Forschung. Berichte der Bunsengesellschaft 72, 905 – 908 (1968)
- E.-A. Reinsch. Theoretische Überlegungen zur Cyclotetraensynthese nach Reppe. Theoretica Chimica Acta. 11, 296 – 306 (1968)
- H. Hartmann, J. Heidberg, H. Heydtmann, G.H. Kohlmaier (Ed.). Chemische Elementarprozesse. Springer, Berlin (1968) Book
- H. W. Spiess, H. Haas, H. Hartmann: Anisotropic Chemical Shifts in Cobalt (III) Complexes. Journal of Chemical Physics 50(7), 3057 (1969)
- H. Hartmann: Chemische Bindung in Festkörpern: Angewandte Chemie 83(14) 521 – 523 (1971)
- H. Hartmann: Eine klassische Störungstheorie. Theoretica Chimica Acta 21, 185 –190 (1971)
- H. Hartmann: Über die Hartreesche Methode. Theoretica Chimica Acta 27 (2) 147–149 (1972) https://doi.org/10.1007%2FBF00528157
- H. Hartmann: Die Bewegung eines Korpers in einem ringformigen Potentialfeld, Theoretica Chimica Acta 24, 201–206 (1972).
- M.W. Morsy, A. Rabie, A Hilal and H Hartmann: Consequences of resonance tunnelling in chemical kinetics. Theoretica Chimica Acta 35(1) 1–15 (1974)
- B. Zeiger: Klassische Störungstheorie nicht-reaktiver molekularer Wechselwirkungen. Universität Frankfurt (1975) Dissertation
- H. Hartmann, R. Schuck, J. Radtke: Die diamagnetische Suszeptibilität eines nicht kugelsymmetrischen Systems. Theoretica Chimica Acta 42(1) 1–3 (1976)
- H. Hartmann, K.-M. Chung: Quantum-Theoretical Treatment of Motions of Ions in Ion Cyclotron Resonance Cells. Theoretica Chimica Acta 45, 137 – 145 (1977)
- H. Kelm (Ed.): High Pressure Chemistry: Proceedings of the NATO Advanced Study Institute Held in Corfu, Greece, September 24 – October 8, 1977. D. Reidel Pub Co (1978) Book

ISBN 90-277-0935-1 (90-277-0935-1)

- H. Hartmann: 25 years of Ligand-field-theory. Pure and Applied Chemistry (6) 827–837 (1977) http://media.iupac.org/publications/pac/1977/pdf/4906x0827.pdf
- H. Hartmann, K.-M. Chung: On the Application of a Classical Perturbation Theory to the Theory of Coupled Fields. Theoretica Chimica Acta 47 ( 2) 147–156 (1978)
- G. Baykut: Untersuchungen der Ionen-Molekül-Reaktionen von einfachen schwefelorganischen Verbindungen mit Hilfe der Ion-Cyclotron-Resonanzspectroskopie, Frankfurt (1980) Dissertation
- W. Ulmer: On the Representation of Atoms and Molecules as Self-Interacting Field with Internal Structure. Theoretica Chimica Acta 55, 179 – 205 (1980)
- H. Hartmann, K.-M. Chung: Classical nonlinear field theory of chemical bonding. International Journal of Quantum Chemistry 18 (6) 1491–1503 (1980)
- H. Hartmann, H. C. Longuet-Higgins: Erich Hückel. 9 August 1896 – 1816 February 1980, Biog. Memoirs Fellows Roy. Soc. 28, 153 (1982)
- D. Schuch, K.M. Chung, and H. Hartmann: Nonlinear Schrödinger-type field equation for the description of dissipative systems. I. Derivation of the nonlinear field equation and one-dimensional example, Journal of Mathematical. Physics. 24, 1652–1660 (1983)
