= Karl James Jalkanen =

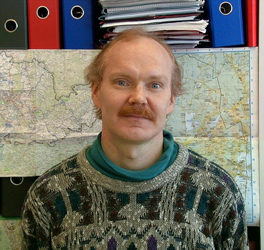

Karl James Jalkanen, FRSC, (born 1958 in Chassell, Michigan), is a research scientist in molecular biophysics. He is currently a research scientist at the Gilead Sciences new La Verne, California manufacturing facility in the Department of Technical Services.

== Biography ==
Before moving to California he was a visiting senior research scientist in the Department of Micro- and Nanotechnology at the Technical University of Denmark (DTU Nanotech) in Kgs. Lyngby, Denmark, a visiting research professor at Aalto University School of Science and Technology in the Department of Applied Physics, a visiting senior research scientist in the Department of Micro- and Nanotechnology at the Technical University of Denmark (DTU Nanotech) in Kgs. Lyngby, Denmark; a visiting research professor at Kyushu University in Kasuga, Fukuoka, Japan; a visiting FAPESP Professor of Molecular Biophysics at the University do Vale do Paraíba, UniVap, in São Jose dos Campos, São Paulo, Brazil in the Laboratory of Biomedical Vibrational Spectroscopy, LEVB; a visiting senior research scientist at the Bremen Center for Computational Material Science (BCCMS) at the University of Bremen in Bremen, Germany; a visiting professor of biophysics at the Nanochemistry Research Institute (NRI) at Curtin University of Technology in Perth, WA, Australia; a visiting scholar at the German Cancer Research Center (DKFZ) in Heidelberg, Germany; a visiting professor of biophysics in the Laboratory of Physics at Helsinki University of Technology, now Aalto University in Otaniemi, Finland; and an associate professor of biophysics at the Technical University of Denmark.

== Research ==
From his biography on the Australian Research Network for Advanced Materials (ARNAM), his focus is:

Experimental and experimental vibrational spectroscopy as a probe of structure, function and mechanisms in complex biological systems and processes. Molecular modeling using molecular mechanics, semi-empirical, density functional theory and ab initio methods to model and understand complex biological process: protein function and catalysis.

His 72 peer reviewed scientific papers have been cited 3500 times in journals such as the Journal of the American Chemical Society, the Journal of Physical Chemistry, the Journal of Chemical Physics, the Journal of Computational Chemistry, Chemical Physics Letters and Theoretical Chemistry Accounts. According to the Royal Society of Chemistry, he is an "expert in spectroscopic methods used in biophysics".

== Editor ==
He is currently the Editor-in-Chief (EiC) for Current Physical Chemistry. He has also been guest editor for three special issues of Theoretical Chemistry Accounts, the P.J. Stephens Honorary Issue, volume 119, numbers 1–3, the January 2008 issue, with Dr. Gerard M. Jensen, Gilead Sciences, Inc., the Suhai Festschrift Honorary Issue, volume 125, numbers 3–6, the March 2010 issue, and the Akira Imamura Honorary Issue, volume 130, numbers 4–6, the December 2011 issue. He was guest editor with Dr. Gerard M. Jensen, Gilead Sciences, Inc. for the two issue Quantum Nanobiology and Biophysical Chemistry series in Current Physical Chemistry (CPC) that appeared as the January and April in 2013 in volume 3, issues 1 and 2 . The January 2013 and April 2013 issues have been made available online. The Imamura Festschrift Issue articles have appeared online and can be accessed at the Theoretical Chemistry Accounts (TCA) website, along with all other articles in TCA, including articles discussing the triple helix and biospectroscopy papers

== Education ==
- University of Southern California
  - PhD, MSc, Chemistry, Applied Mathematics, 1980 — 1989
- Michigan Technological University
  - BSc, Chemistry, 1977 — 1980
- Michigan State University
  - Chemistry 1976 — 1977
