= Faron Pharmaceuticals =

Finnish drug discovery and development company

- Company type: Public
- Traded as: AIM: FARN
- Industry: Biopharmaceutical, Healthcare
- Founded: 2003
- Founder: Markku Jalkanen and others
- Headquarters: Turku, Finland
- Key people: Markku Jalkanen; CEO
- Products: Traumakine, Clevegen
- Website: http://www.faron.com/

Faron Pharmaceuticals is a Finnish drug discovery and development company based in Turku, Finland.

The company was founded in 2003 by a group led by Markku Jalkanen, who now acts as the company's Chief Executive Officer. It specialises in the development of treatments for acute organ traumas, vascular damage and cancer immunotherapy.

Its lead product Traumakine has been developed to treat acute respiratory distress syndrome (ARDS). It is currently (2020) undergoing international phase III clinical trials after an open-label, early-phase trial showed promising results in the treatment patients with ARDS. The drug is known to function by enhancing lung CD73 expression and increasing production of anti-inflammatory adenosine, such that vascular leaking and escalation of inflammation are reduced. The U.S. Food and Drug Administration FDA has accepted the proposed protocol design for the next Traumakine study in March 2020. The phase III study is a comparison of efficacy in the treatment of patients with ARDS.

In 2020 Traumakine was selected to take part in the WHO Solidarity trial and REMAP-CAP trials to find drugs for the symptoms of Covid_19. In June 2020, Faron received a €2,100,000 low interest rate loan from Business Finland for Traumakine manufacturing.

Faron’s other products include the anti-Clever-1 antibody Clevegen. Clevegen is focused on converting the immune environment around a tumour from being immune suppressive to immune stimulating and represents a novel immuno-oncology approach. Current encouraging phase I/II clinical trials in Europe are soon to be extended to America. In 2020, the trials continue with bowel cancer and other types of cancer. According to the Faron CEO Markku Jalkanen, the first marketing authorisations could potentially be applied for in 2022–2023. In April 2020, the placing of Faron's shares raised €14 million, and with these resources, Faron will expand the Clevegen study to include several difficult types of cancer, e.g. bowel cancer, ovarian cancer, hepatic cancer and pancreatic cancer.

Faron Pharmaceuticals is listed in London on the London Stock Exchange's Alternative Investment Market (AIM). The company is listed secondarily in Helsinki on the Nasdaq First North Growth Market Finland since December 2019. According to the Faron CEO Markku Jalkanen, a secondary listing will enhance the company’s visibility and facilitate the trading of the stock for Scandinavian shareholders.

In May 2020, the national research and innovation project Cancer IO received EUR 10 million in funding from Business Finland's personalized health program, of which EUR 800,000 was funded by Faron Pharmaceuticals and in June 2020 Faron received a EUR 2.1 million low-interest loan from Business Finland for the production of the Traumakine drug.
