= Altenbrenda Castle =

- Bischofsheim an der Rhön-Unterweißenbrunn

Site information
- Type: lowland castle
- Code: DE-BY
- Condition: burgstall (no above-ground ruins)

Location
- Coordinates: 50°24′02″N 10°02′53″E
- Height: 380 m above sea level (NN)

Site history
- Built: Mittelalterlich

Altenbrenda Castle was a lowland castle, now reduced to a burgstall, located in the Großer Garten, 1000 metres northeast of the present village of Unterweißenbrunn in the borough of Bischofsheim an der Rhön in the Lower Franconian county of Rhön-Grabfeld in Bavaria.

The burgstall is situated near the sewage works for Unterweißenbrunn, in an area that is known today as the abandoned village (Wüstung) of Altenbrenda.

== Literature ==
- Björn-Uwe Abels: Führer zu vor- und frühgeschichtlichen Denkmälern. Band 28: Bad Kissingen, Fränkische Saale, Grabfeld, Südliche Rhön. Verlag Philipp von Zabern, Mainz 1975, S. 99.
- Björn-Uwe Abels: Die vor- und frühgeschichtlichen Geländedenkmäler Unterfrankens. (Materialhefte zur bayerischen Vorgeschichte, Reihe B, Band 6). Verlag Michael Lassleben, Kallmünz 1979, ISBN 3-7847-5306-X, S. 167.
