= Futebol Clube Primeira Camisa =

Primeira Camisa
- Full name: Futebol Clube Primeira Camisa
- Nickname(s): Formigão do Vale
- Founded: 2 March 2007; 18 years ago
- Ground: ADC Parahyba
- Capacity: 2,500
- 2011: Paulistão 2ª Divisão, 11th of 44
Home colours	Away colours

Futebol Clube Primeira Camisa, commonly known as Primeira Camisa, is a currently inactive Brazilian football club based in São José dos Campos, São Paulo state.

== History ==
The club was founded on March 3, 2007, by the former footballer Roque Júnior, and professionalized its football department in 2007, competing for the first time in a professional competition in the 2008 Campeonato Paulista Segunda Divisão, when they were eliminated in the First Stage of the competition.

== Stadium ==
Futebol Clube Primeira Camisa play their home games at Estádio ADC Parahyba. The stadium has a maximum capacity of 2,500 people.
