= Estádio Martins Pereira =

Soccer stadium in São José dos Campos, Brazil

Martins Pereira
- Martins Pereira
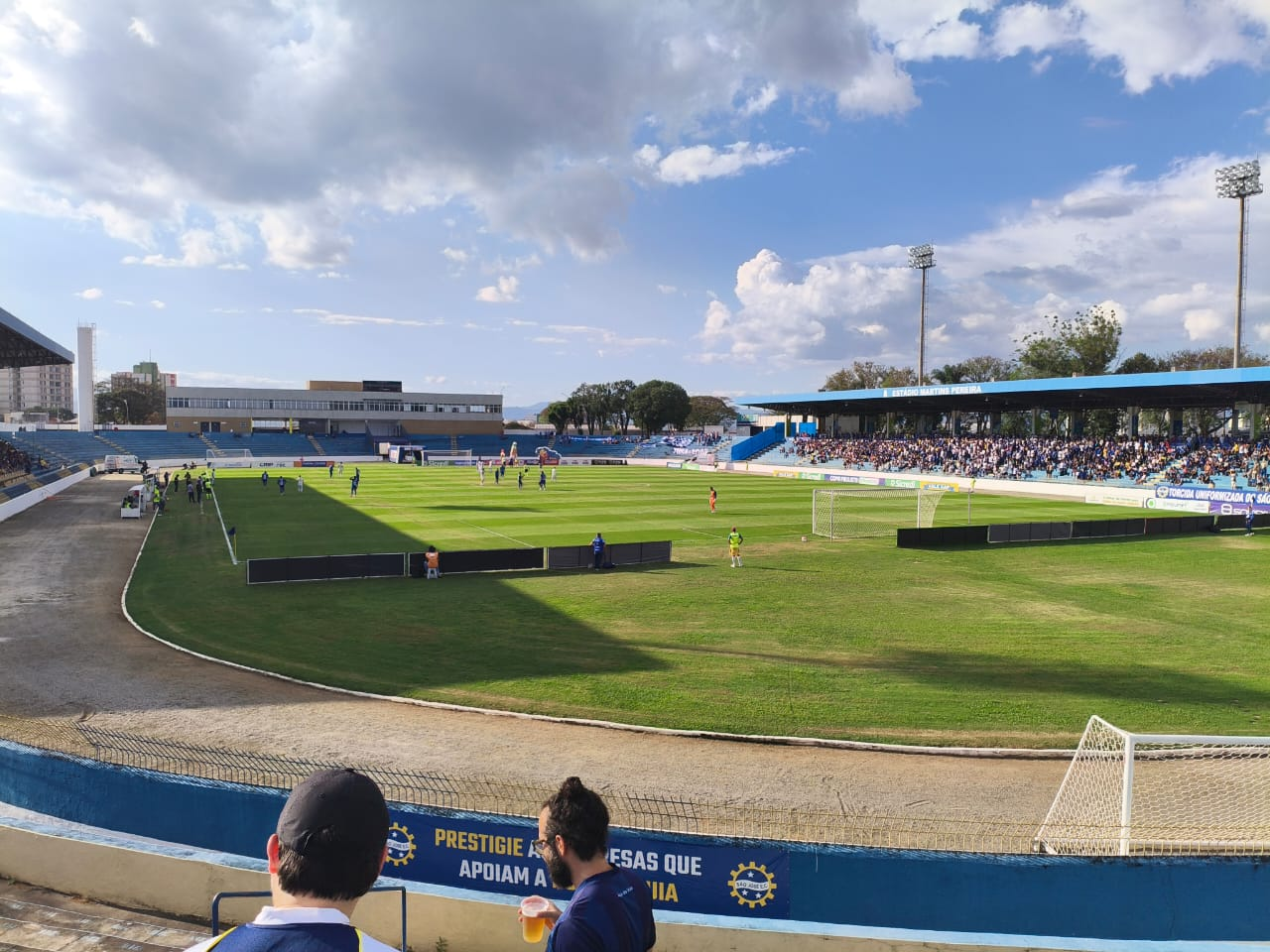
- Interactive map of Martins Pereira
- Full name: Estádio Municipal Martins Pereira
- Location: São José dos Campos, São Paulo state, Brazil
- Coordinates: 23°11′19″S 45°52′12″W
- Owner: Urbam - Urbanizadora Municipal
- Operator: Grupo Oscar Calçados
- Capacity: 12,234
- Surface: Natural grass
- Field size: 105 by 68 metres (114.8 yd × 74.4 yd)

Construction
- Built: 1968
- Opened: 15 March 1970
- Renovated: 2013–2014

Tenants
- São José Esporte Clube; São José Esporte Clube (women); Clube Atlético Joseense

Estádio Municipal Dr. Mário Martins Pereira, usually known simply as Estádio Martins Pereira, is a football (soccer) stadium in São José dos Campos, São Paulo state, Brazil. The stadium holds 12,234 people.

Inaugurated in 1970, the stadium's formal name honors Mário Martins Pereira, who, together with his brother, called Nélson, donated the groundplot where the stadium was built.

== History ==
The city's stadium in the late 1960s, called Estádio da Rua Antônio Saes, had a maximum capacity of only 5,000 people, and wood bleachers, so, it was sold to allow the building of Estádio Martins Pereira. The stadium construction started in 1968. During the stadium construction time, the football clubs of the city were deactivated.

Martins Pereira's inaugural match was played on 15 March 1970, when Atlético Mineiro beat Internacional 1–0, with the first goal of the stadium being scored by Atlético Mineiro's Dadá Maravilha. São José Esporte Clube played their first match at the stadium seven days later, losing 1–0 to Nacional-SP.

In 1975, due to São José's debts, the stadium was auctioned and bought by Urbam. On 20 January 2007, the stadium registered its biggest attendance, as more than 20,000 people attended a Copa São Paulo de Futebol Júnior match between São José and Cruzeiro, which ended 6–2 for the latter club.

In July 2014, after more than one year under renovations, the stadium was reinaugurated and had its capacity expanded from 16,500 to 21,500 people; officially, however, the stadium's capacity was set on nearly 12,200 people. In August 2019, São José defeated Matonense 10–0 on the stadium, setting the largest win of the club's and the stadium's history.

On 15 September 2023, Martins Pereira was granted to private initiative for a period of 25 years, extendable for a further 10 years; the winner of the bid was Grupo Oscar, also the owner of the club's SAF.
