= Clevegen =

Immunotherapy drug

Clevegen (Bexmarilimab) is a new cancer immunotherapy drug under development in Finland by Faron Pharmaceuticals.

The drug is an anti-Clever-1 antibody which can convert immune suppressive type-2 tumour-associated macrophages (TAMs) to immune active type-1 microphages and has the potential for wide use in oncology. It is currently (2019) undergoing trials (codename MATINS) as an innovative treatment for metastatic or inoperable solid tumours such as cutaneous melanoma and hepatobiliary/hepatocellular, pancreatic, ovarian and colorectal cancers, all of which host a significant number of Clever-1-positive TAMs and represent some 2 million cases annually worldwide.

Following encouraging results of early European trials regarding the drugs tolerability and safety the MATINS programme is being extended to the USA. Later trials will study the drug's efficacy in treating patients with high Clever-1 occurrence, who can be readily identified by liquid biopsy using a blood myeloid cell staining technique.
