= Bischofsheim in der Rhön =

Bischofsheim i.d.Rhön
- Town
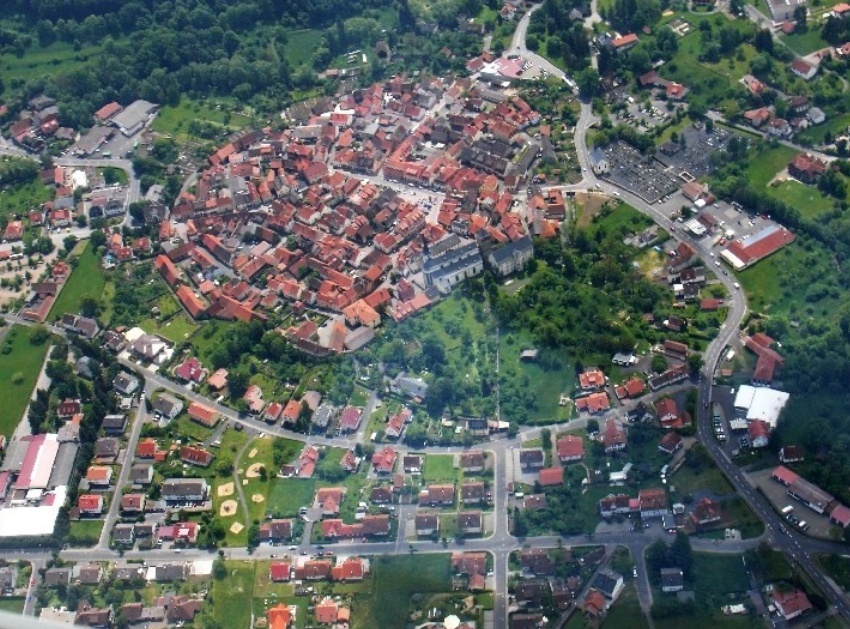
- Aerial view

- Coat of arms

- Location of Bischofsheim i.d.Rhön within Rhön-Grabfeld district
- Interactive map of Bischofsheim i.d.Rhön
- Location within Germany Location within Bavaria
- Coordinates: 50°24′N 10°01′E
- Country: Germany
- State: Bavaria
- Admin. region: Unterfranken
- District: Rhön-Grabfeld
- Subdivisions: 5 Stadtteile

Government
  - Mayor (2022–28): Georg Seiffert (CSU)

Area
  - Total: 67.7 km^{2} (26.1 sq mi)
- Elevation: 448 m (1,470 ft)

Population (2025-12-31)
  - Total: 4,686
  - Density: 69.2/km^{2} (179/sq mi)
- Time zone: UTC+01:00 (CET)
  - Summer (DST): UTC+02:00 (CEST)
- Postal codes: 97653
- Dialling codes: 09772
- Vehicle registration: NES
- Website: www.bischofsheim-rhoen.de

Bischofsheim in der Rhön (German pronunciation: [ˈbɪʃɔfsˌhaɪm ʔɪn deːɐ̯ ˈʁøːn], lit. 'Bischofsheim in the Rhön'; before January 2020: Bischofsheim an der Rhön) is a town in the district Rhön-Grabfeld, in Bavaria, Germany. It is situated in the Rhön Mountains, 29 km southeast of Fulda.

== Town Structure ==
Several originally separate villages became part of the town Bischofsheim. These are Frankenheim, Haselbach, Oberweißenbrunn, Unterweißenbrunn and Wegfurt.

== History ==
In a document of the early 13th century Bischofsheim was first mentioned. The town is much older, probably 8th century. The name Bischofsheim (German: home of the bishop) indicates that the town was maybe founded by Saint Boniface. As Bischofsheim is situated between Fulda and the palatinate Salz, Boniface founded a settlement to rest on the way.

== Sights ==
- Altenbrenda Castle ruins
- Kreuzberg, 2nd highest mountain of the Rhön Mountains (932 metres)
- Kloster Kreuzberg (monastery, built 1681 – 1692)
- Town tower Zehntturm (13th century, 26 metres high)
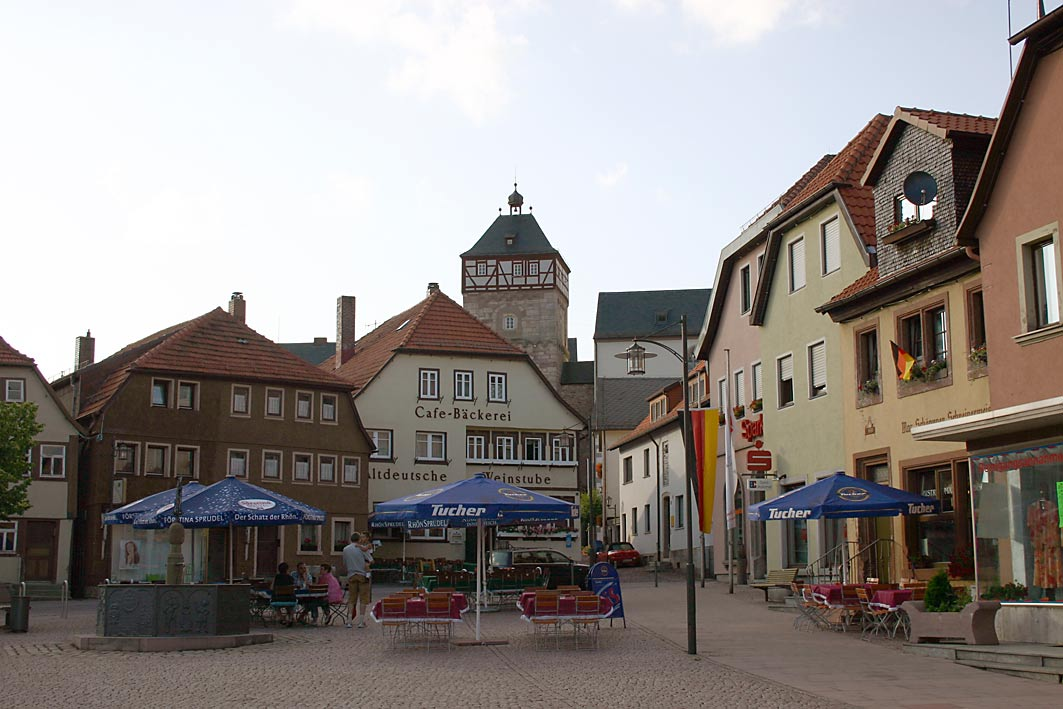
Market place of Bischofsheim

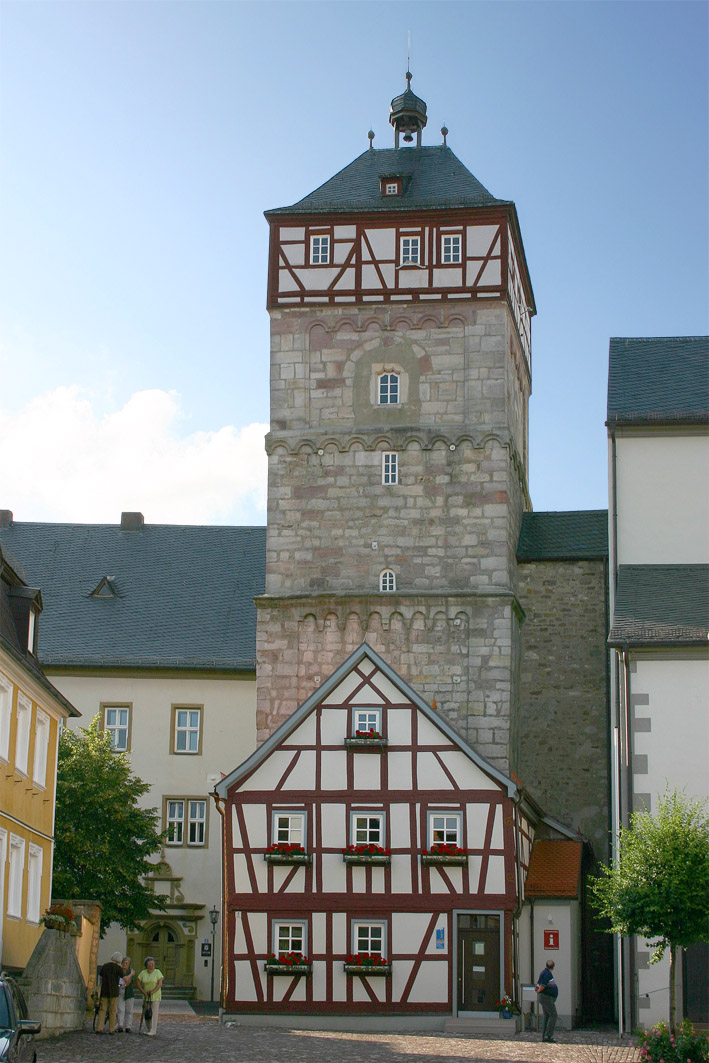
Tower „Zentturm“

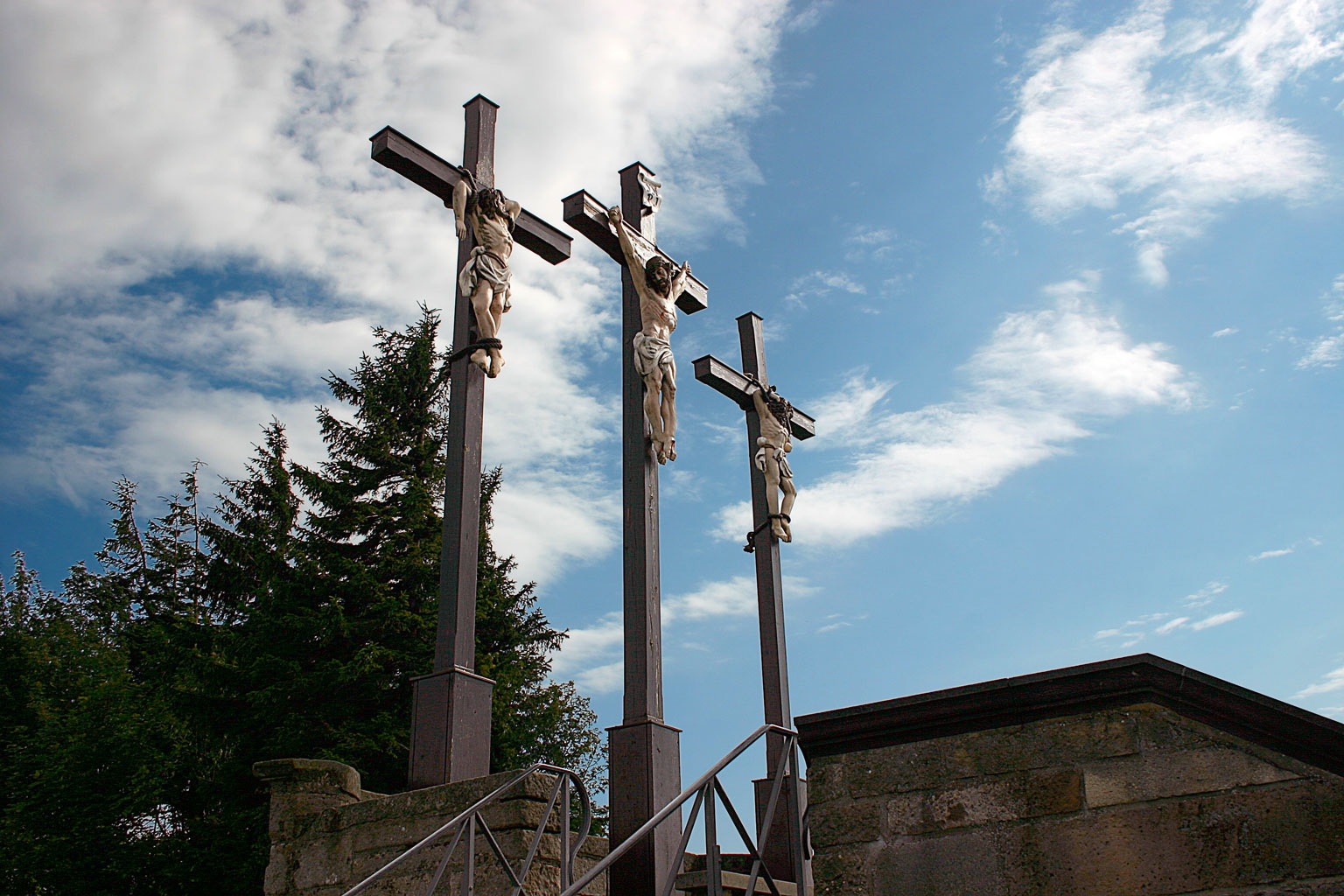
Crosses on the Kreuzberg

== Born in Bischofsheim ==
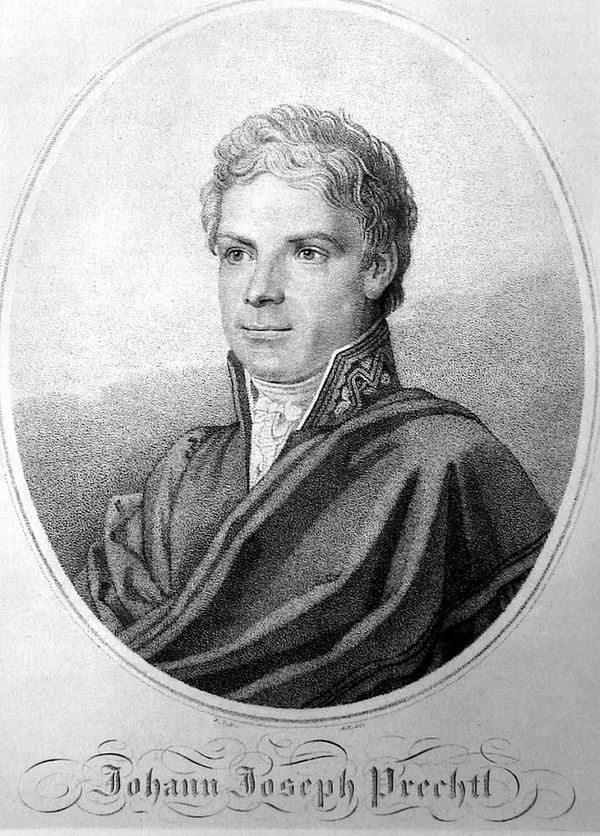
Johann Joseph von Prechtl around 1815

- Johann Joseph von Prechtl (1778–1854), Austrian Empire technical researcher
- Hans Schlenck (1901–1944), German Empire stage and film actor, theater director
- Hermann Hartmann (1914–1984), West German chemist
