= Universidade do Vale do Paraíba =

Private university in São Paulo, Brazil

University of Paraíba Valley
- Universidade do Vale do Paraíba
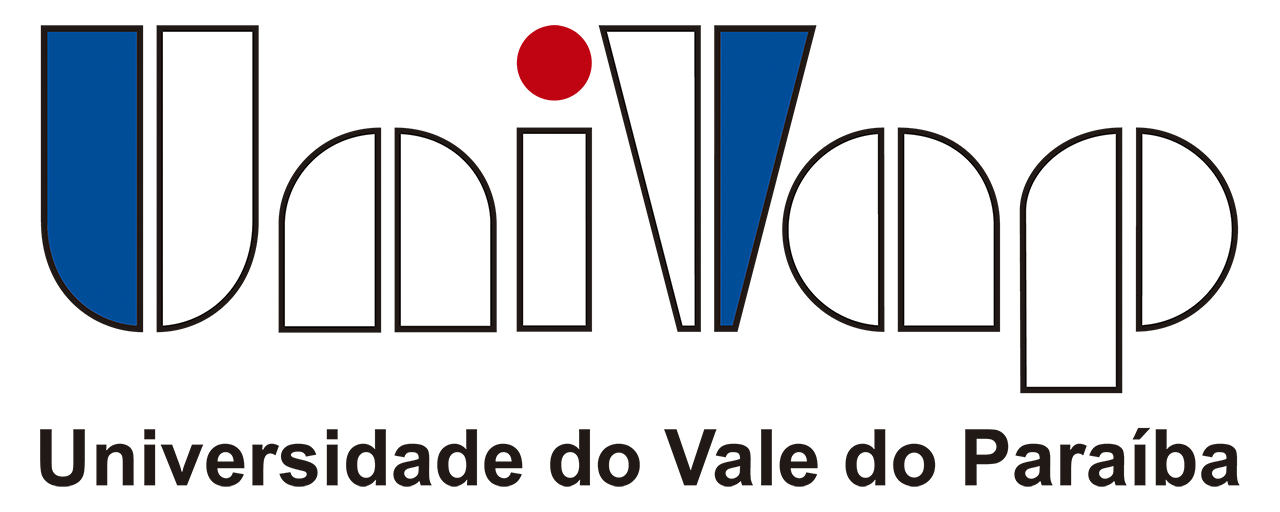
- Former names: Universidade do Vale do Paraíba
- Motto: Scientia et Labor
- Motto in English: Science and Work
- Type: Private university
- Established: 1952
- Rector: Dr. Milton Beltrame Junior
- Location: São José dos Campos, SP, Brazil
- Nickname: UNIVAP
- Website: www.univap.br

University of Paraíba Valley (Universidade do Vale do Paraíba, Univap) is a private university in São José dos Campos in the state of São Paulo, Brazil.

In 40 years, the Universidade do Vale do Paraíba (University of Paraíba Valley) or, as it is more popularly known, Univap, has evolved from a small, local law school into a major, multifaceted university of quality and renown.

The history of Univap begins with the establishment of the Valeparaibana Teaching Foundation (FVE) in August 1963. The initiative came from prominent community leaders who were concerned with creating a trained labor force and improving the local education and culture and contributing to the city’s progress.

Other courses were added to the curriculum and, in 1982, the FVE was restructured to become the Faculdades Integradas de São José dos Campos. Ten years later, in April 1992, the expanded educational facility was given “university” status and rechristened as Univap.

== Urbanova campus ==
The university’s Urbanova campus was created in 1993, covering an area larger than a million square meters, bounded by the Paraiba river on one side and accessible from the city via Shishima Hifumi Avenue on the other.

The campus complex consists of more than a dozen buildings, including five devoted specifically to the Faculties of the Education Department. Other major buildings include the Research Department (IP&D), the Central Library, and the Administrative Center.

The campus features technical and administrative support offices, conference rooms, libraries, cafeterias, copy centers, a bookstore, and parking lots. There are ample sports and recreational facilities for students and faculty, including tennis courts, soccer fields, athletic tracks, dressing rooms, and a swimming pool, as well as a leisure area with kiosks (where the students may have barbecues and parties), lakes for fishing and boating, gardens, and a gymnasium available to the public.

A business incubator and a technological park/center are on the campus.
