= Markku Jalkanen =

Markku Jalkanen (born 1954) is a scientist, biotech entrepreneur and businessman from Turku, Finland. He is the CEO of Faron Pharmaceuticals, a Finnish biopharmaceutical company listed on London's Alternative Investment Market and Nasdaq's First North Growth Market. Jalkanen was the founding CEO and President of Biotie Therapies, the first publicly traded biotech-company in Finland. He is an advisor for the Finnish life-science fund, Inveni Capital.

== Education and career ==
Jalkanen obtained a master's degree in Medical Biochemistry from the University of Kuopio, a PhD in Medical Biochemistry from the University of Turku and completed his post-doctoral training at Stanford University. He obtained the position of docent in Biochemistry from University of Helsinki and the same qualification in Molecular and Cell Biology from the University of Turku.

Jalkanen has received awards for his scientific research and business achievements: The Anders Jahre Medical Prize for Younger Researchers in 1993, The Developer of Turku Award of 1993, The 1994 Academic Publicity Award, Teacher of the Year 1996 of the University of Turku, The Inno-Suomi Award in 1998 for the entrepreneurial industrialization of academic discoveries (BioTie).

Jalkanen pioneered Finnish biotech development while being the first Director (Professor) of Turku Biotechnology Center within BioCity community in Turku. He has published over 130 peer-reviewed scientific publications in various highly ranked international journals and has a HIRSCH-index of >45.
