= São José dos Campos =

- Municipality
- Municipality of São José dos Campos
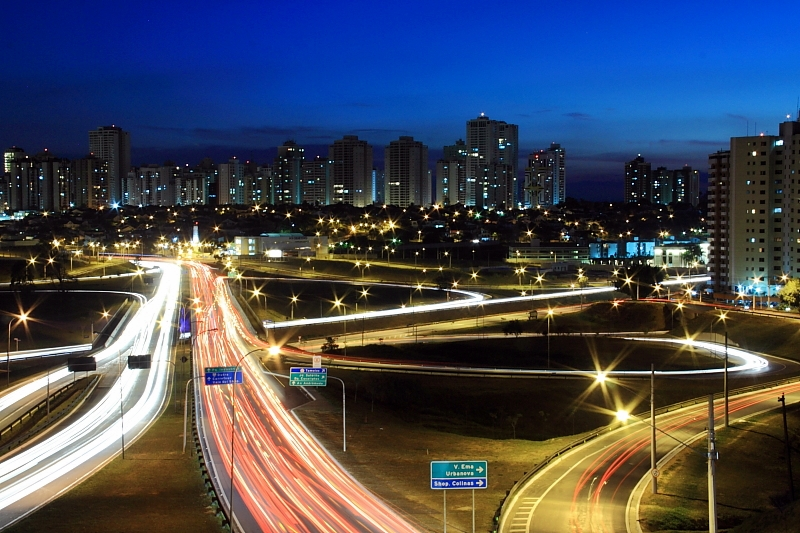
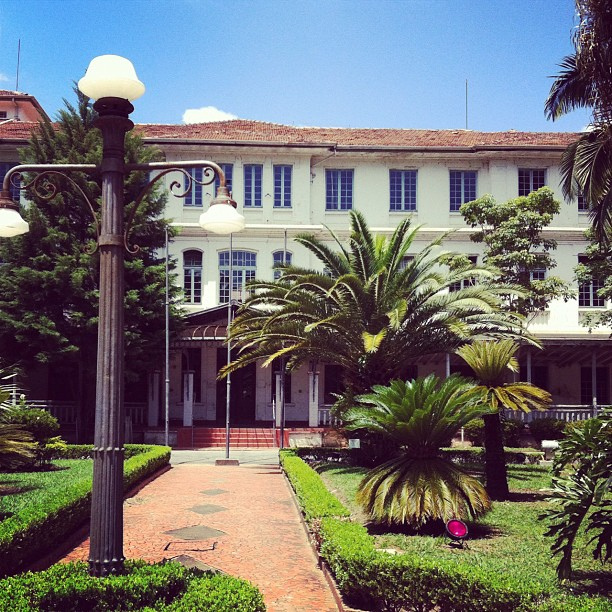
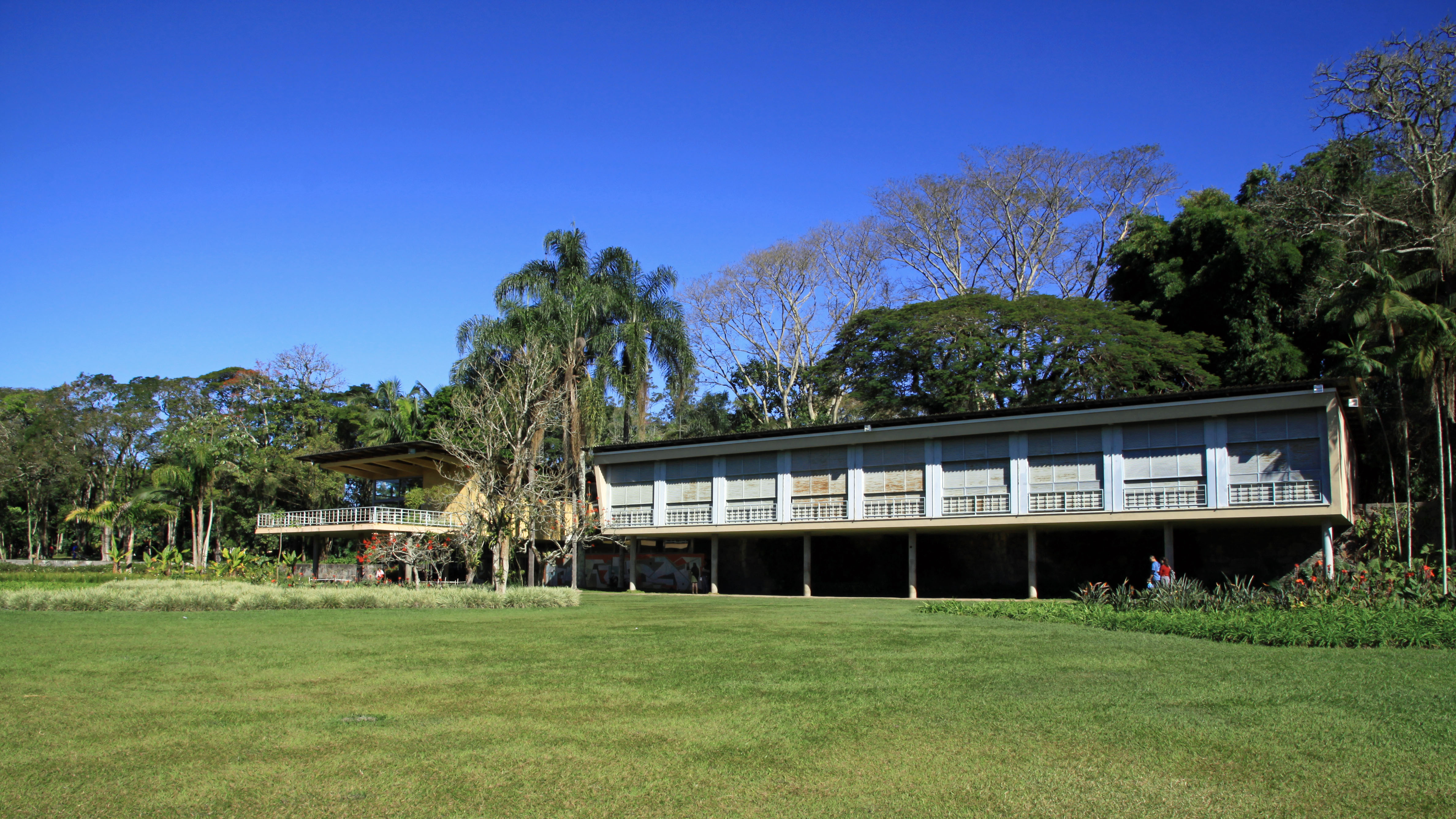
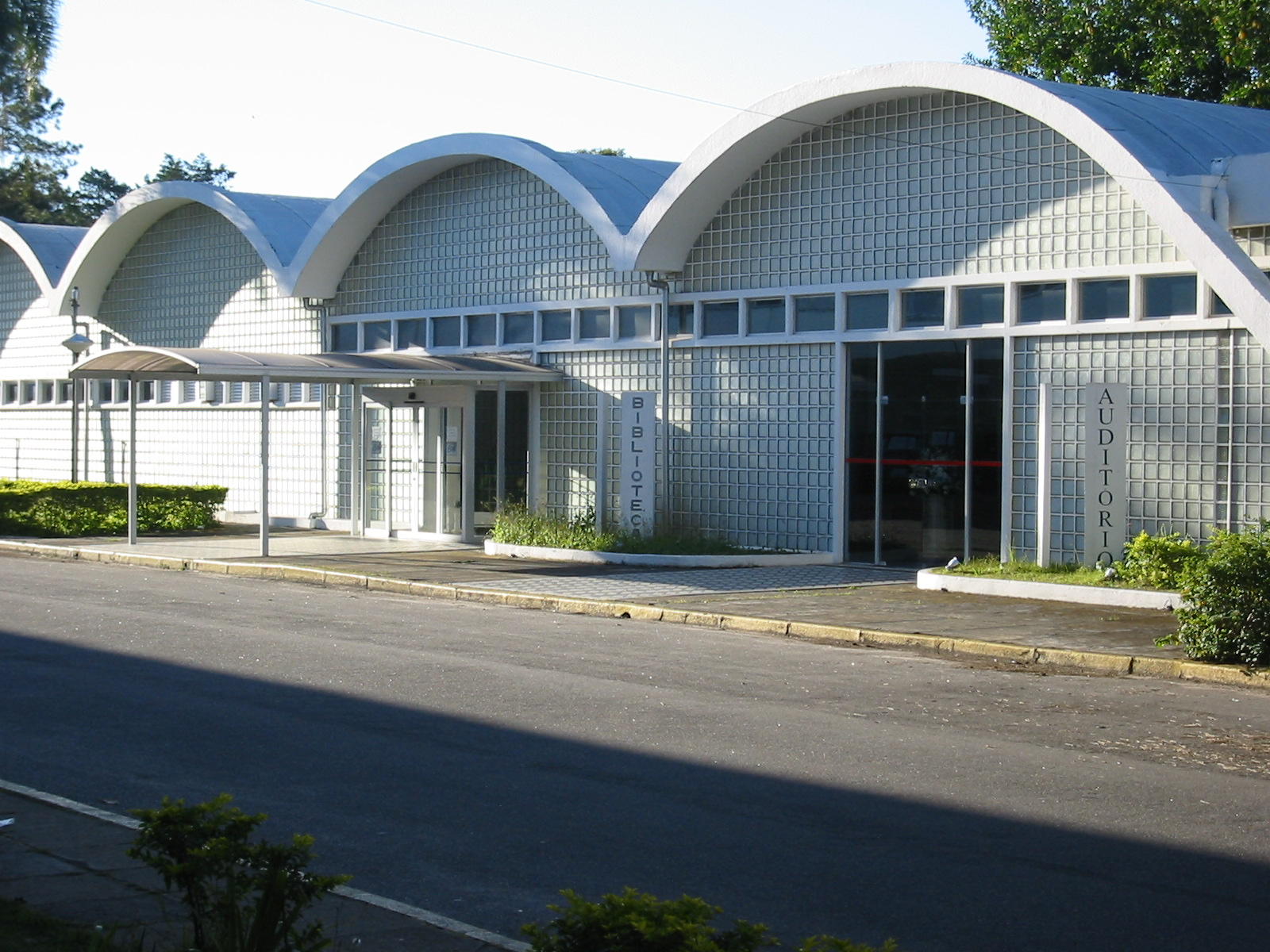
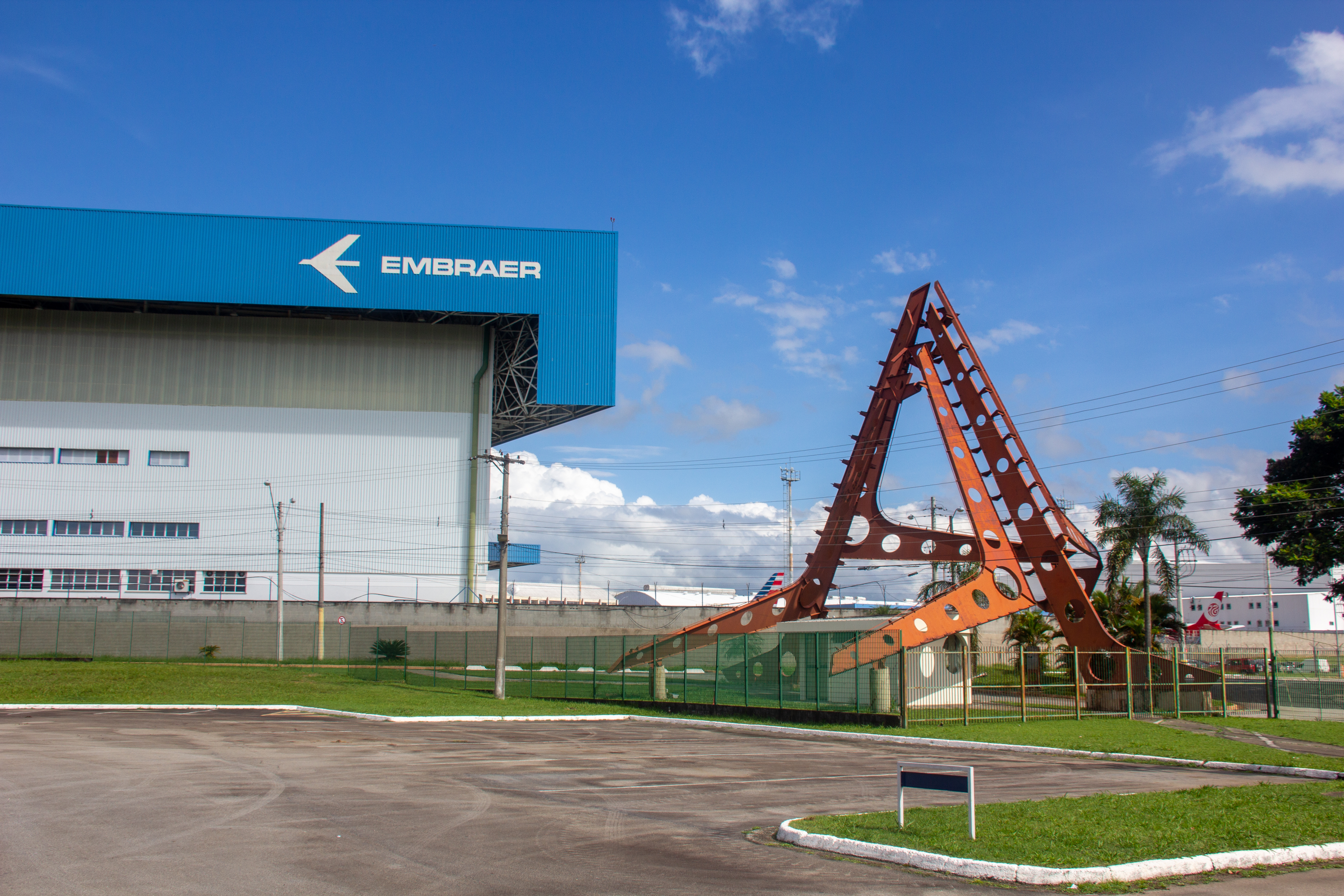
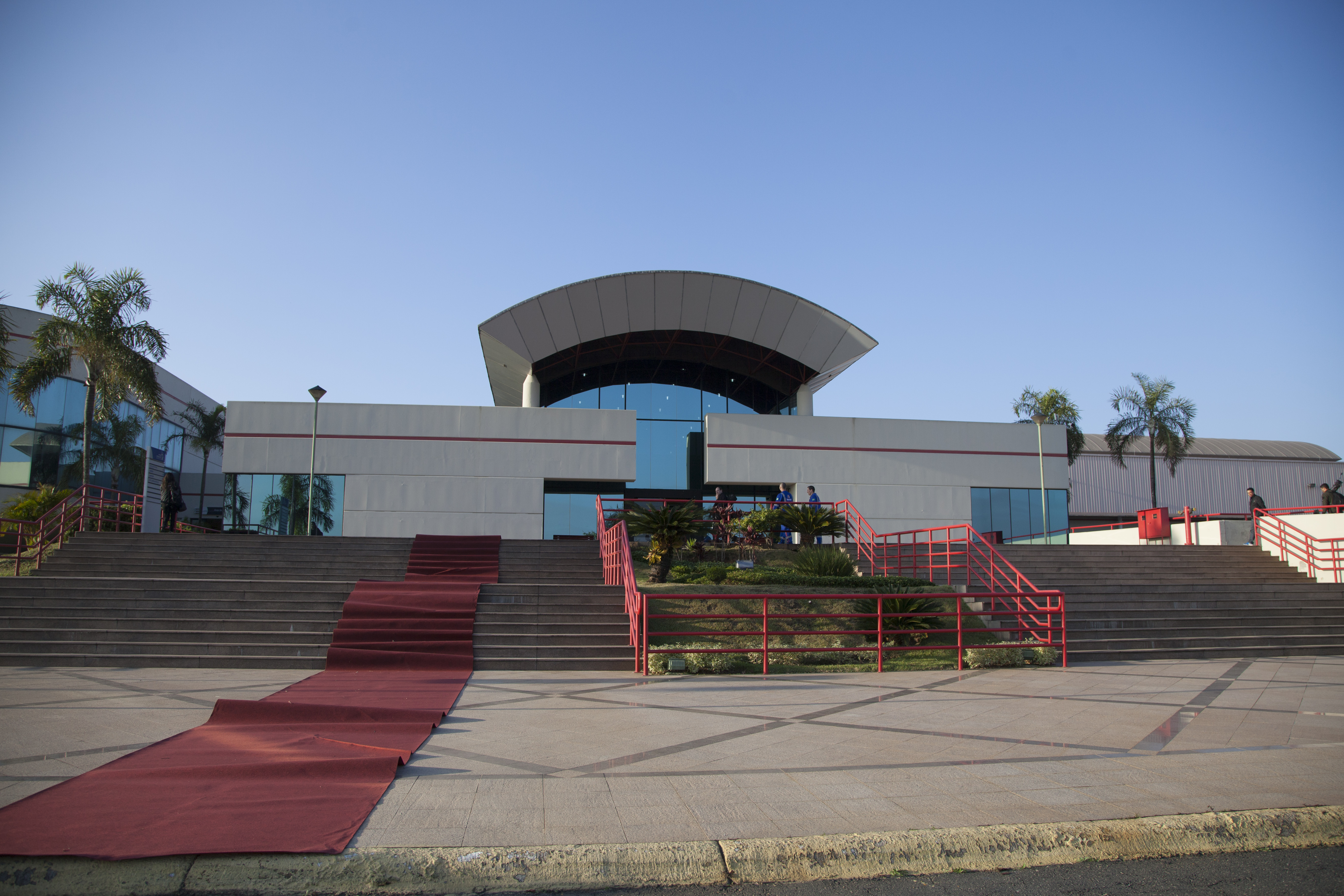
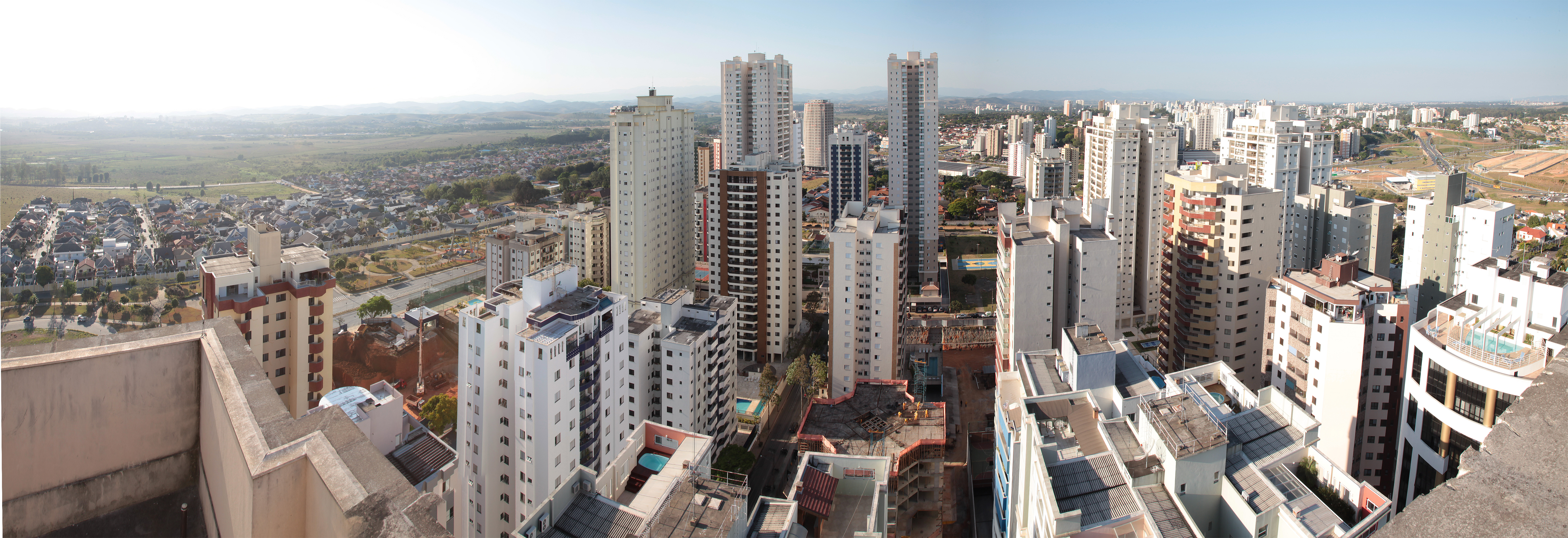
- From the top, from left to right: view of the city from the Presidente Dutra Highway; Vicentina Aranha Park; Residence of Olívio Gomes in Parque da Cidade; library of the Aeronautics Institute of Technology; Brazilian Aerospace Memorial; Technologic Park; panorama of the Altos da Esplanada region.

- Flag Coat of arms
- Nicknames: Capital of the Valley and The Airplane Capital
- Motto: "Aura terraque generosa" (Latin) "Generous are the winds of my land"
- Location in the state of São Paulo and Brazil
- Coordinates: 23°10′44″S 45°53′13″W
- Country: Brazil
- Region: Southeast
- State: São Paulo
- Metropolitan Region: Vale do Paraíba e Litoral Norte

Government
  - Mayor: Anderson Farias (PSD)

Area
  - Municipality: 1,099.409 km^{2} (424.484 sq mi)
  - Urban: 298.99 km^{2} (115.44 sq mi)
- Elevation: 619 to 2,082 m (2,031 to 6,831 ft)

Population (2025 estimate)
  - Municipality: 727,078
  - Density: 661.335/km^{2} (1,712.85/sq mi)
  - Metro: 2,528,354

GDP (PPP, constant 2015 values)
  - Year: 2023
  - Total: $30.0 billion
- Time zone: UTC−3 (BRT)
- Postal Code: 12200-000
- Area code: +55 12
- HDI (2010): 0.807 – very high
- Website: sjc.sp.gov.br

São José dos Campos (Portuguese pronunciation: [sɐ̃w ʒuˈzɛ dus ˈkɐ̃pus], Portuguese for 'Saint Joseph of the Fields') is a major city and the seat of the municipality of the same name in the state of São Paulo, Brazil. One of the leading industrial and research centers with emphasis in aerospace sciences in Latin America, the city is located in the Paraíba Valley, between the two most active production and consumption regions in the country; São Paulo (80 km (50 mi) from the city) and Rio de Janeiro (320 km (200 mi)). It is the main city of the Metropolitan Region of Vale do Paraíba e Litoral Norte. A native of São José dos Campos is called a joseense (Portuguese pronunciation: [ʒozɛˈẽsi]). Being the second most populous non-capital city in Brazil – behind Campinas – São José dos Campos lies in the middle of the Expanded Metropolitan Complex ("Complexo Metropolitano Expandido"), the first megalopolis in the Southern Hemisphere, with over thirty million inhabitants. The city's metro area also includes Greater São Paulo, Campinas, Santos and Sorocaba.

The municipality concentrates many major companies and industries, such as Embraer, Panasonic, Johnson & Johnson, Ericsson, Philips, General Motors, Petrobras, and Monsanto among others. São José dos Campos also holds relevant education and research institutions, such as ITA, INPE, CEMADEN, IEAv, IEA, IFI, UNESP, UNIFESP, DCTA, FATEC, UNIVAP and IP&D, holding a position that puts the city as the largest aerospatial complex in Latin America. The Technological park ("Parque Tecnológico de São José dos Campos"), the largest one in the country, is the only research institute in the world that includes all three top global plane production companies, Embraer, Boeing and Airbus.

== Geography ==
=== Area ===

- total area: 1,099.60 km^{2} (424.56 sq mi)
  - urban area: 353.9 km^{2} (136.6 sq mi) (32.18%)
  - rural: 745.7 km^{2} (287.9 sq mi) (67.82%)

=== Borders ===
- Northern Border: Camanducaia, Sapucaí Mirim in Minas Gerais
- Southern Border: Jacareí, Jambeiro in São Paulo State
- Eastern Border: Monteiro Lobato, Caçapava in São Paulo State
- Western border: Igaratá, Joanópolis, Piracaia in São Paulo State

=== Metropolitan Area ===
The intense conurbation process has been creating a metropolis whose center city is São José dos Campos, reaching many other municipalities like Jacareí, Taubaté, Aparecida, Caçapava, Guaratinguetá, Campos do Jordão, Caraguatatuba, Pindamonhangaba and Lorena. The Paraíba Valley metropolitan area is currently made up of 39 cities, comprising 2,453,387 inhabitants.

The metro area is part of the Expanded Metropolitan Complex, being a megalopolis that connects São Paulo and Rio de Janeiro, encompassing São José dos Campos and Campinas with over 30 million inhabitants in total.

=== Cityscape ===

The municipality comprises three districts: São José dos Campos — the city itself (also the seat), Eugênio de Melo and São Francisco Xavier. The last one is known for its natural sites and ecotourism.

The district of São José dos Campos is also subdivided into 2 subdistricts (São José dos Campos and Santana do Paraíba).

However, for administrative purposes, the city is composed of 7 urban regions: Center, North, South, West, East, Southeast and São Francisco Xavier.

=== Topography ===
Highlands predominate in the northern region of the municipality with altitudes ranging from 660 to 975 m (2,165 to 3,199 ft). The northern border of the municipality lies over the Serra da Mantiqueira Mountains (Mantiqueira Range), with some peaks reaching over 2,000 meters (6,562 ft.). The highest point in the municipality is known as 'Pico do Selado' at an altitude of 2082 meters (6,831 ft).

In the urban area, there are rolling plateaus and hills. The lowest elevation in the city (and also in the municipality) is found in the Paraíba do Sul River, at a mean elevation of 550 m.

The municipality is bounded at the south by the 'Serra do Jambeiro' mountains, with an elevation of about 900 m (2,953 ft). Due to the high topographic differences among neighborhoods and the urbanization, the city now experiences micro-climates present in distant areas. The downtown tends to concentrate frequent urban heat islands, while the suburb areas get noticeably colder main temperatures.

- Municipality: Elevations 550 to 2,082 m (1,804 to 6,831 ft)
- City: Elevations 550 to 690 m (1,800 to 2,260 ft).

The municipality holds the 11,559-hectare (28,560-acre) São Francisco Xavier Environmental Protection Area, established in 2002.

It contains part of the 292,000-hectare (720,000-acre) Mananciais do Rio Paraíba do Sul Environmental Protection Area, created in 1982 to protect the sources of the Paraiba do Sul River.

=== Climate ===
São José dos Campos

Climate chart (precipitation, max. and min. temperature)
J	F	M	A	M	J	J	A	S	O	N	D
216 29 19	191 29 19	165 30 18	81 27 14	59 25 11	42 21 9	33 20 9	33 24 11	73 26 12	113 28 15	134 29 16	174 29 18
- █ Average max. and min. temperatures in °C
- █ Precipitation totals in mm
- Source: Clima dos Municipios Paulistas Cepagri
Imperial conversion
J	F	M	A	M	J	J	A	S	O	N	D
8.5 84 65	7.5 84 66	6.5 85 64	3.2 80 58	2.3 77 51	1.7 70 48	1.3 68 48	1.3 74 51	2.9 80 53	4.5 82 60	5.3 83 62	6.9 84 64
- █ Average max. and min. temperatures in °F
- █ Precipitation totals in inches

São José dos Campos has a humid subtropical climate with significantly less precipitation during winters. Winters are very mild, with the average temperature in the coldest month near 17 °C. Summers are not excessively hot, with the average temperature of the hottest month of 24 °C. Frosts are very rare, happening on average once per decade. However, fogs are common, occurring mostly during the winters.

Climate data for São José dos Campos (1961-1990)
Month	Jan	Feb	Mar	Apr	May	Jun	Jul	Aug	Sep	Oct	Nov	Dec	Year
Record high °C (°F)	36.7 (98.1)	36.4 (97.5)	36.2 (97.2)	34.0 (93.2)	32.2 (90.0)	30.7 (87.3)	31.9 (89.4)	36.9 (98.4)	37.5 (99.5)	36.9 (98.4)	36.3 (97.3)	35.8 (96.4)	37.5 (99.5)
Mean daily maximum °C (°F)	29.7 (85.5)	30.1 (86.2)	29.5 (85.1)	27.3 (81.1)	25.1 (77.2)	24.3 (75.7)	24.1 (75.4)	26.2 (79.2)	27.2 (81.0)	27.3 (81.1)	28.0 (82.4)	28.7 (83.7)	27.3 (81.1)
Daily mean °C (°F)	22.2 (72.0)	22.4 (72.3)	21.6 (70.9)	19.6 (67.3)	17.0 (62.6)	16.1 (61.0)	15.6 (60.1)	17.1 (62.8)	18.8 (65.8)	19.4 (66.9)	20.3 (68.5)	21.4 (70.5)	19.3 (66.7)
Mean daily minimum °C (°F)	16.2 (61.2)	16.5 (61.7)	15.7 (60.3)	13.2 (55.8)	10.1 (50.2)	8.9 (48.0)	8.2 (46.8)	9.9 (49.8)	11.9 (53.4)	13.4 (56.1)	14.2 (57.6)	15.3 (59.5)	12.8 (55.0)
Record low °C (°F)	8.2 (46.8)	9.5 (49.1)	8.8 (47.8)	4.2 (39.6)	0.4 (32.7)	0.1 (32.2)	0.1 (32.2)	0.8 (33.4)	1.2 (34.2)	3.4 (38.1)	4.6 (40.3)	5.2 (41.4)	0.1 (32.2)
Average precipitation mm (inches)	192.5 (7.58)	151.2 (5.95)	132.8 (5.23)	59.8 (2.35)	30.3 (1.19)	32.5 (1.28)	26.6 (1.05)	31.9 (1.26)	52.8 (2.08)	120.5 (4.74)	122.0 (4.80)	202.1 (7.96)	1,155 (45.47)
Average precipitation days (≥ 1.0 mm)	13	11	11	5	4	4	3	3	5	10	9	13	91
Average relative humidity (%)	79.5	79.3	79.8	78.9	78.5	66.1	74.2	70.6	71.8	76.8	76.8	79.1	76.0
Mean monthly sunshine hours	180.2	151.3	179.2	179.3	176.4	180.4	189.4	198.6	156.8	148.4	165.1	163.4	2,068.5
Source: Instituto Nacional de Meteorologia,

== History ==
The origins of São José dos Campos lie at the end of the 16th Century when Jesuits founded a cattle farm, Aldeia do Rio Comprido. The farm was created through a concession of settlements around 1590 to the Society of Jesus. The farm was located on the banks of the Rio Comprido, natural division between São José and the city of Jacareí today.

The farm status was an artifice to hide a religious outpost, one of the several Jesuit Reductions in Brazil, known for their resistance to enslavement, from the Portuguese expedition leaders and indigenous people hunters, known as the Bandeirantes.

On September 10, 1611, the local was officially recognized and the farmers precluded from utilizing the Natives as slaves. However, a turmeric conflict between farmers and the religious led to the expulsion of the Jesuits in 1640 from the region and the consequent dispersion of the mission.

Nevertheless, the Jesuits returned and reestablished a new settlement, where the current city center is spotted. It was about 15 km (9.3 mi) northeast of the previous mission, on a higher plain with a privileged view above a geological depression, which guaranteed security against invasions and floods. Again, despite being a new mission, it was officially treated as a cattle farm.

The initial urbanization plan is attributed to the Jesuit priest Manoel de Leão, whose main occupation was really to be an administrator of the community.

In 1692, documents named the village as Residência do Paraíba do Sul; in 1696 as Residência de São José.

At the beginning of the gold mining economic cycle in Brazil, the settlement goes through serious difficulties due to the exit of labor to the mines.

After the definitive expulsion of Jesuits from the Portuguese Empire in 1759, all the religious order's assets, such as farms, colleges and villages were taken under the Portuguese Crown's custody. The governor, D. Luis Antonio Botelho Mourão, had as a priority to turn these new assets into productive units and increase tax collection. For that, Boutelho Mourão successfully requested authorization from the Viceroy to create civil parishes, known as freguesias, and to change the fiscal status of villages to the category of Vila (town).

Then, on July 27, 1767, São José reached the official status of town, with a hall and a pillory, passing over the status of civil parish; and the name Vila de São José do Paraíba was formalized. But for many years it maintained the same rural characteristics. The main difficulty was the fact that the Estrada Real (Royal Road) passed by its limits, far from the village.

=== Cotton and coffee ===
In the middle of the 19th century, the village of São José do Paraíba had demonstrated some signs of economic growth through the development of agriculture. Cotton production evolved rapidly in the region, exported to the English textile industry. The production reached a peak in 1864.

In the same year, on April 22, the town became the seat of a municipality, acquiring finally, in 1871, the current name of São José dos Campos, followed by the creation of a judiciary district in 1872. Almost simultaneously, there was development of coffee crops in Paraíba Valley, which started to take off in 1870.

In 1886, after the opening of the Estrada de Ferro Central do Brasil railway (1877), the coffee production peaked. Then started to decay, running steady until the 1930s.

=== Hydro-mineral retreat and industrialization ===
Inauguration of the General Motors Factory in São José dos Campos by President Juscelino Kubitschek, 1959.

The call for the municipality of São José dos Campos for the treatment of pulmonary tuberculosis by sanatoriums became noticed at the beginning of last century, due to its supposedly favorable climate conditions. The city became known as the Sanatorium City. The country's then-largest hospital, the Vicentina Aranha Sanitarium, was opened in town in 1924, and in 1935 the municipality was officially recognized as a health retreat.

With the advent of antibiotics in the 1940s, tuberculosis begins to be treated anywhere, thus ending the healthcare advantage carried out by São José, whereas the establishment of industries was about just to start.

The industrialization process of the municipality takes hold from the installation of the Technological Institute of Aeronautics in 1950 and also with the opening of the Dutra Highway (BR-116), thus making possible a faster connection between Rio de Janeiro and São Paulo and cutting into the urban area of São José dos Campos. Altogether, these factors allowed the municipality to make strides towards fulfilling its scientific and technological potential.

== Demographics ==
Historical population (municipality)
Year	Population	%±
1920	30,681
1940	36,279	18.2%
1950	44,804	23.5%
1960	77,533	73.0%
1970	148,332	91.3%
1980	287,513	93.8%
1991	442,370	53.9%
2000	539,313	21.9%
2010	629,921	16.8%
2022	697,054	10.7%

== Government ==
São José dos Campos has a "strong mayoral" system in which the mayor is vested with extensive executive powers, as it is in all municipalities in Brazil. The mayor is elected to a four-year term by universal voting. The City Council is elected every four years with the mayor.

=== The state administrative region of São José dos Campos ===

The State of São Paulo is divided politically and administratively into 15 regions. São José dos Campos is the seat and the name of the 3rd Administrative Region, which includes the North Coast of São Paulo state and the Paraíba Valley.

The region comprises 39 municipalities with sharp contrasts. São José dos Campos is a densely populated city, with approximately 2,100 inhabitants/km^{2} (5,43 inhabitants/km^{2}) in urban area, whereas the quiet municipality of São José do Barreiro has only 7 inhabitants/km^{2} (18 inhabitants/km^{2}). There are both highly industrialized cities and the others in the region are focused on agriculture and tourism. São José dos Campos is well known as the Capital do Vale which means that São José dos Campos is the most important city of the Paraíba Valley.

It is one of the state's most dynamic areas, the fourth one in terms of population density, and covers 11.3% of the state's territory. The main municipalities are São José dos Campos, Taubaté, Jacareí, Guaratingueta, Caraguatatuba, Campos do Jordão, São Sebastião, Lorena, Pindamonhangaba, Ubatuba and Caçapava.

- Population of the region: 2,243,687 (est. 2018/IBGE)
- Population Density: 288.56 inhabitants/km^{2}

=== List of mayors ===
- João Cursino (1908/1910, 1913/1916, 1919/1930)
- Rui Dória (1931)
- Francisco José Longo (1938/1941)
- Elmano Ferreira Veloso (1949/1950, 1953/1956, 1958/1961, 1966/1970)
- Jorge Zarur (1947 and 1950)
- José Marcondes Pereira (1962/1966)
- Sérgio Sobral de Oliveira (1970/1975)
- Ednardo José de Paula Santos (1975/1978)
- Joaquim Vicente Ferreira Bevilacqua (1978/1982, 1989/1990)
- Hélio Augusto (1986)
- Ângela Guadagnin (1993/1996)
- Emanuel Fernandes (1997/2000, 2001/2004)
- Eduardo Cury (2005/2008, 2009/2012)
- Carlinhos Almeida (2013/2016)
- Felicio Ramuth (2017/2022)
- Anderson Farias (2022/-)

== Sites ==
Several fairs and expositions are done at the two pavilions located in the city.

A list of notable sites:

- Augusto Ruschi Biological Reserve
- Burle Marx Municipal Park with the Olivo Gomes residence
- CTA and MAB (Brazilian Aerospace Memorial)
- Espaço Mário Covas (former City Council seat)
- INPE – (National Institute for Space Research)
- Sanatorium Vicentina Aranha
- Santos Dumont Park (total area: 46,347 m^{2})
- Alberto Simões Park

== Entertainment, leisure and sports ==
Although São José is an industrial center, the city still preserves green areas and quiet town districts. Around 62% of the area from the municipality is characterized as an environmental preservation area. On the outskirts of the urban area, Augusto Ruschi Ecology Reserve has many local plant species. The natural reserve has 2,500,000 m^{2} (27,000,000 sq ft), being a government protect area for the local flora. São Francisco Xavier is a community the offers many of those attributes as well.

Furthermore, there is an easy access to the mountain cities (Campos do Jordão, Santo Antônio do Pinhal) and to the beaches of the Northern Coast of São Paulo, being both of the areas in a distance of only 80 km from São José dos Campos.

The city has three major parks and several sports and country clubs. Tenis Clube and Associação Esportiva São José have hosted the 35th Banana Bowl International Tennis Federation Juniors Circuit in 2005 and 2006.

A soccer stadium, called Estádio Martins Pereira, is the home ground of São José Esporte Clube, a professional soccer team.

Notable teams from the city:

Club	Sport	Arena	Foundation of the Club	Logo
Associação Esportiva São José	Basketball	Ginásio Linneu de Moura	1913	
Associação Esportiva São José	Swimming	Ginásio Linneu de Moura	1913	
São José Esporte Clube	Football	Estádio Martins Pereira	1933	
Tenis Clube São José	Basketball	Ginásio Municipal José Edvar Simões	1948	
Tenis Clube São José	Volleyball	Ginásio Esportivo Manoel Bosco Ribeiro	1948	
São José Rugby Clube	Rugby union	Estádio Martins Pereira	1987	
Clube Atlético Joseense	Football	Estádio Martins Pereira / Estádio ADC Parahyba	1998	
Scott–Marcondes Cesar–São José dos Campos	Cycling	n/a	1993	N/a
São José Futsal	Futsal	Ginásio Tênis Clube	2006	
FC Primeira Camisa	Football	Estádio ADC Parahyba	2007	

There are 19 movie theaters and 7 theaters including one inside the Univap – University of Vale do Paraíba.

== Education and research centers ==
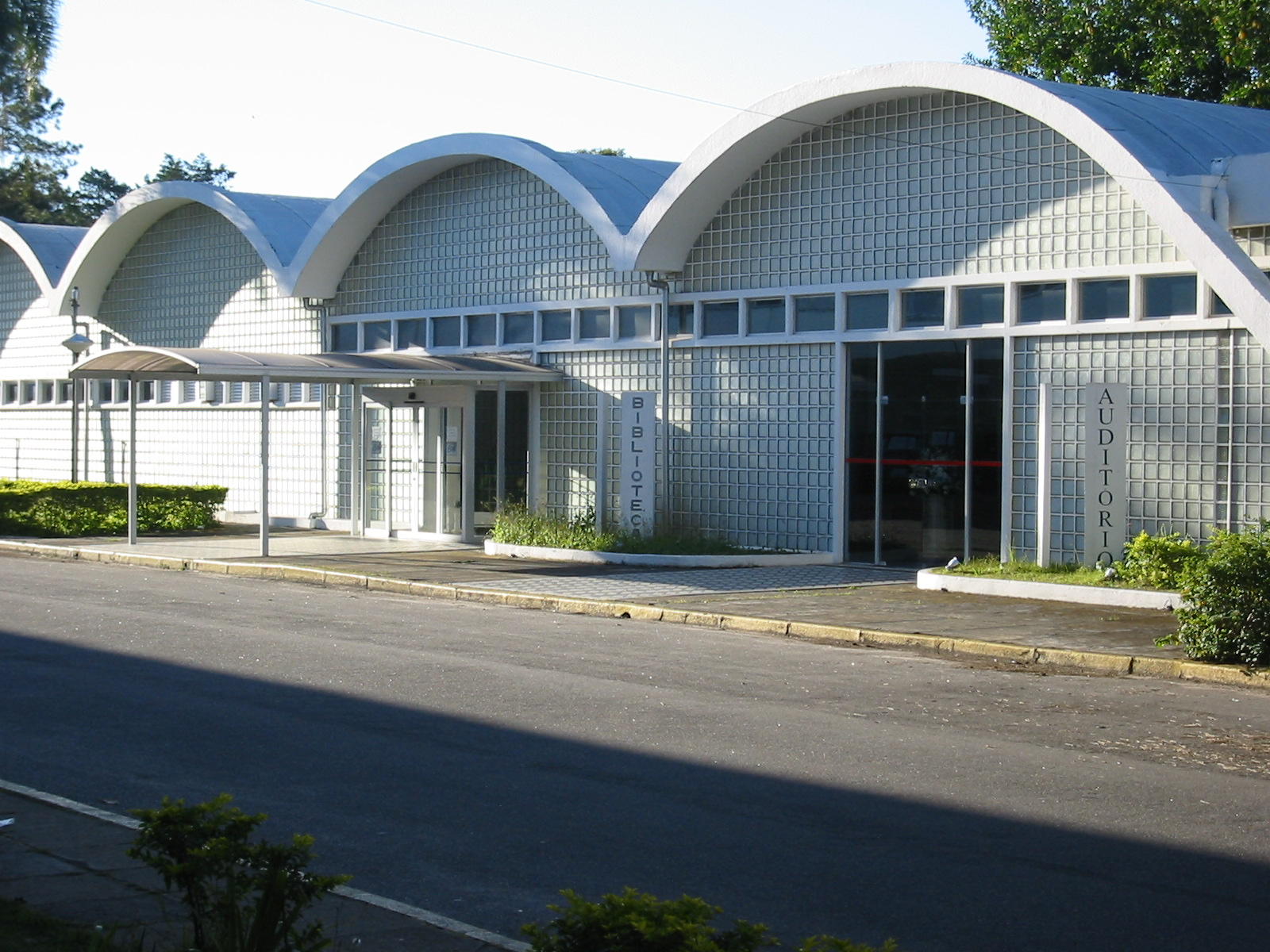
Library of ITA, designed by Oscar Niemeyer

The Brazilian National Institute for Space Research (INPE) has its headquarters in São José dos Campos. It coordinates intensive research and development in areas such as Earth observation, space sciences and space technologies. Also the Brazilian General Command for Aerospace Technology (CTA) has its facilities in the city. There are 176 secondary schools, 210 primary schools, 109 preschools and 75 high schools.

=== Universities and colleges ===
- Faculdade INPG – INPG college campus in S.J dos Campos; Nationally ranked MBA School by Magazine Você S/A, Edition Nov/2010.
- IBTA – Instituto Brasileiro de Tecnologias Avançadas
- Unip – Universidade Paulista
- Unifesp – Federal University of São Paulo
- Univap – University of Vale do Paraíba
- Faap – Fundação Armando Alvares Penteado
- UNESP-Universidade do Estado de São Paulo
- Fatec -Faculdade de Tecnologia de São José dos Campos
- ITA – Aeronautics Technological Institute
- Instituto de Filosofia Santa Terezinha
- Faculdades de Ciências Aplicadas
- EEI – Escola de Engenharia Industrial de São José dos Campos
- Inea – National Advanced Instruction Institute
- FGV – Fundação Getúlio Vargas – Conveniado Conexão Desenvolvimento Empresarial
- ETEP – Escola Técnica Everardo Passos

=== Research centers ===
- INPE – The Brazilian National Institute for Space Research
- Brazilian General Command for Aerospace Technology (CTA) with its four institutes: Aeronautics and Space Institute (IAE), Institute for Advanced Studies (IEAv), Industrial Foment and Coordination Institute (IFI) and ITA

=== Technical schools ===
- ETEP – Escola Técnica Everardo Passos
- CETEX – Expoente Technical Center
- ETEC – State Technical school

== Infrastructure ==
=== Transportation ===
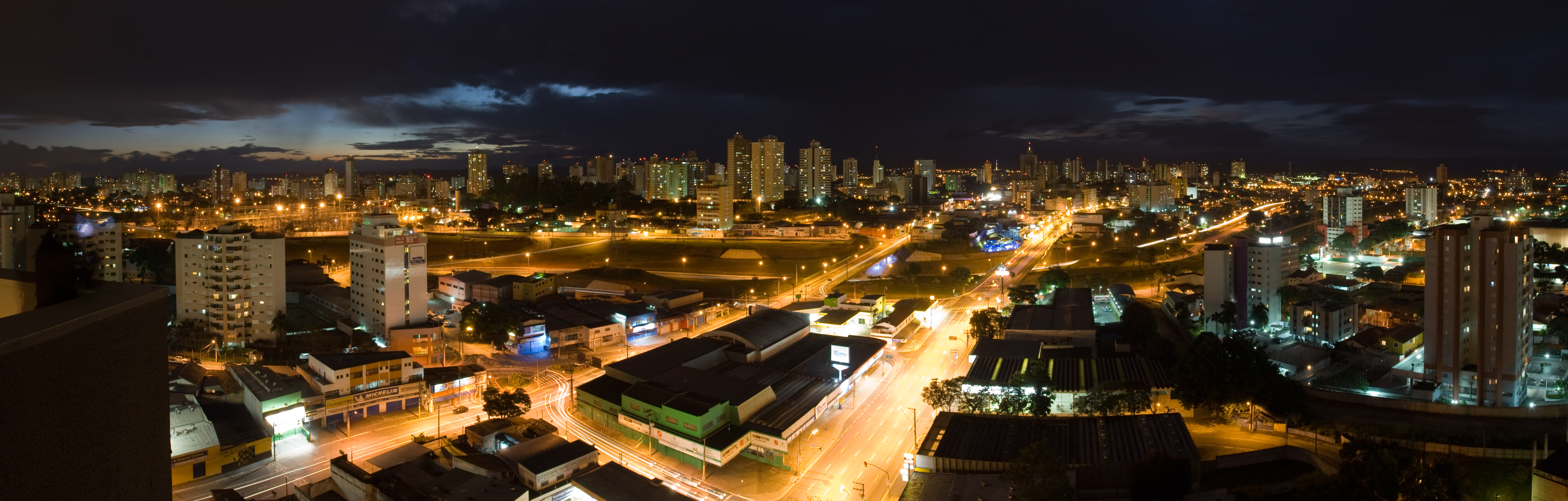
São José dos Campos.

The city has two bus stations, having lines to cities in all regions of the country and international routes to Argentina, Paraguay, Uruguay and Chile.

São José dos Campos boasts an extensive bus system. Operated by three companies (Expresso Maringa, Julio Simões and Viação Capital do Vale), these lines serve nearly all areas in the city with 319 buses. São José dos Campos also has an alternative system with minivans to supplement the regular buses.

The city uses a ring road system, that interconnects it to important national and state highways:

- BR-116 (federal highway), which crosses the urban area of São José. It runs in a north–south direction in the country, near but not on Brazil's coastline. The section that connects Rio de Janeiro to São Paulo is known as Presidente Dutra. It is widely used inside the urban area of São José dos Campos for commuting purposes;
- SP-070 (state highway) also known as Rodovia Carvalho Pinto which connects São Paulo to Taubaté;
- SP-065 Connects São Jose dos Campos to Campinas
- SP-099 (state highway) also known as Rodovia dos Tamoios which connects São José to the coastal lowlands of the city of Caraguatatuba;

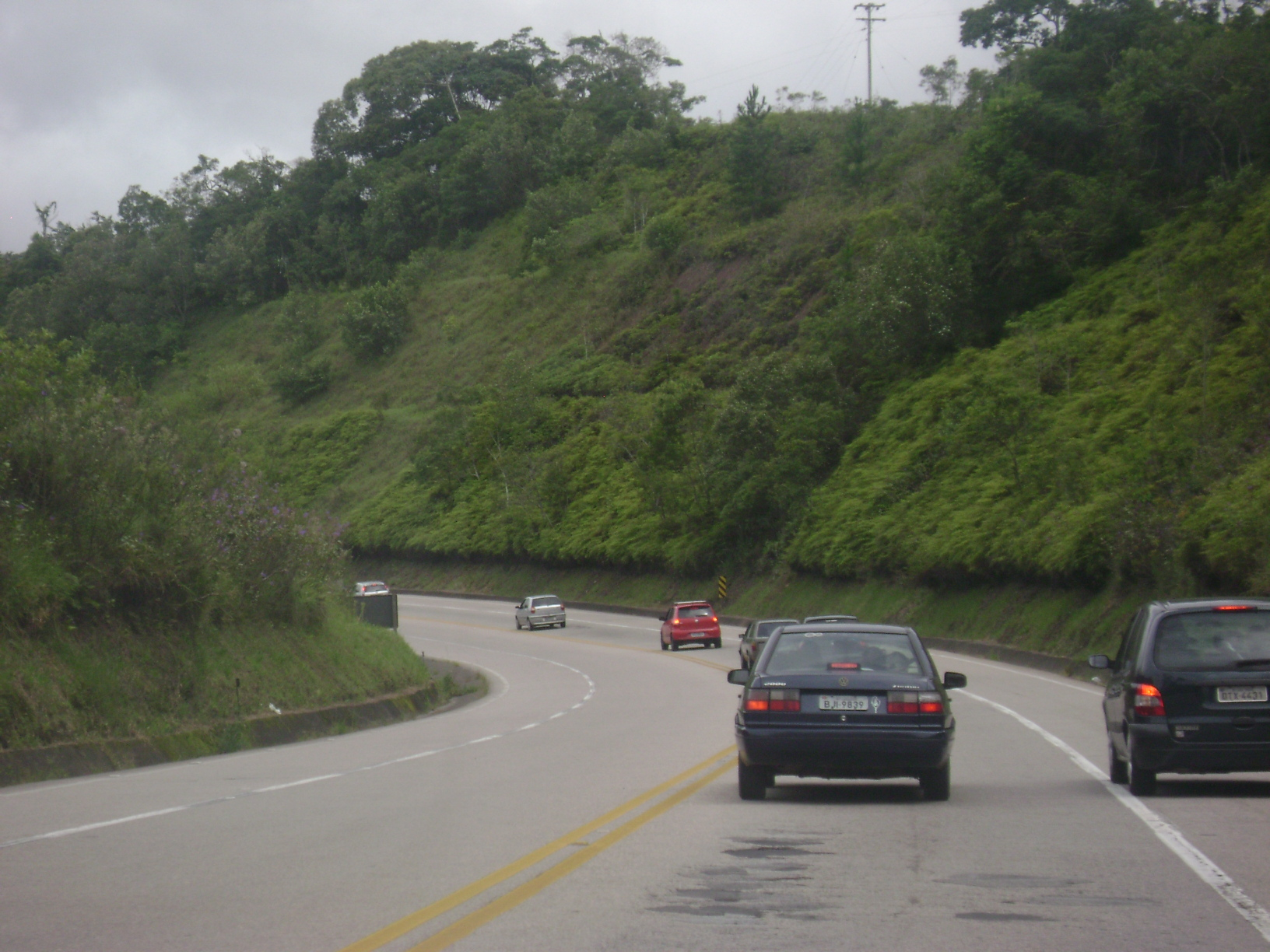
Tamoios Highway

- SP-050 (state highway) – the old road which connects São José dos Campos to Campos do Jordão and the southern region of Minas Gerais.

The city is also served by a railway (the former Central do Brasil), administered by MRS Logística, which today only carries freight.

The ports of São Sebastião and Santos can be reached by the highways SP-099, SP-155, and BR-101. The transportation of cargo to the domestic and foreign markets is made through both ports.

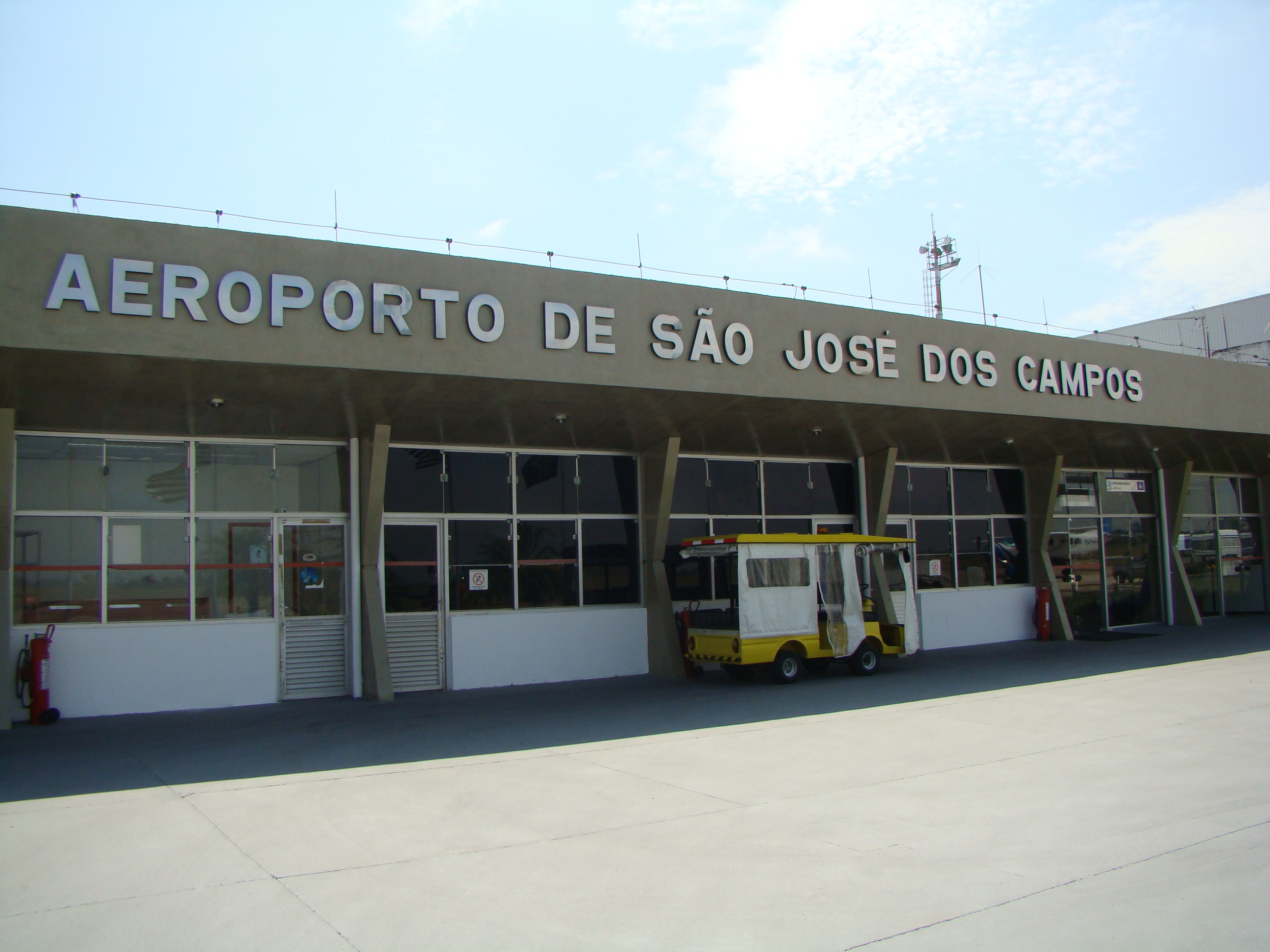
São José dos Campos Airport

The São José dos Campos Airport (IATA: SJK, ICAO: SBSJ) has a heavy passenger flow, mainly business trips during weekdays, and it is an important connection between São Paulo and Rio de Janeiro. With a 3,000 m (9,800 ft) runway, the airport also serves people who come to visit the tourist city of Campos de Jordão. The airlines Azul Brazilian Airlines and TRIP Linhas Aéreas fly from São José dos Campos to several destinations and presently are the only commercial airlines operating on São José dos Campos.

It is also used for the transportation of cargo from the several industries located in the so-called Cone Leste Paulista ("São Paulo's East Cone"). Infraero and the Federal Revenue Agency are also introducing a new concept called airport-industry, that will offer fiscal incentives and fast importation and exportation procedures. The municipality has also a Customs Station for the Hinterland (dry port), controlled by the Federal Revenue Agency.

São José dos Campos receives natural gas from two gas pipelines, and large companies such as General Motors, Kodak, Monsanto and Embraer are among the main users. The city is the third largest in the country referring to the distribution net of natural gas for residential use.

=== Communication ===
In telecommunications, the city was served by Companhia Telefônica Brasileira until 1973, when it began to be served by Telecomunicações de São Paulo. In July 1998, this company was acquired by Telefónica, which adopted the Vivo brand in 2012.

The company is currently an operator of cell phones, fixed lines, internet (fiber optics/4G) and television (satellite and cable).

It has also a large network of fiber optics, with broadband services covering 75% of the city. There is 1 telephone for each 3 inhabitants and a vast service network of cellular telephones.

== Economy ==
Economic statistics
GDP	BRL 17.6 billion (2004)
Value added	BRL 14,795 million (2005)
GDP per capita	BRL 29,950 (2004)
Labour force	267,332 (2003) (from 45% to 50% of pop.)
Labour force by occupation	industry (19.4%), commerce (17.3%), services (50.9%), construction (2.2%), public sector (9.6%), other (0.5%) (2003)
Main industries	aerospace, defense, automotive, chemical, pharmaceutical, telecommunications, components, consumer durables, oil and petrochemical
Foreign commerce
Exports	BRL 4,947 million (2005)
Imports	BRL 2,619 million (2005)
Public finances
Municipal Budget	BRL 868 million (2005)
Announced investments	$0.436 billion (2004)
Social statistics
Human Development Index (UNDP)	0.807 – very high (2010) versus Brazilian HDI of 0.755 – high (2014)
Literacy rate	95.7%

=== Agriculture ===
The municipality cultivates different crops: rice, tomato, potatoes, orange and many vegetables; cattle are raised for beef and milk supply. There are also farms for production of eggs and chicken.

=== Industry ===
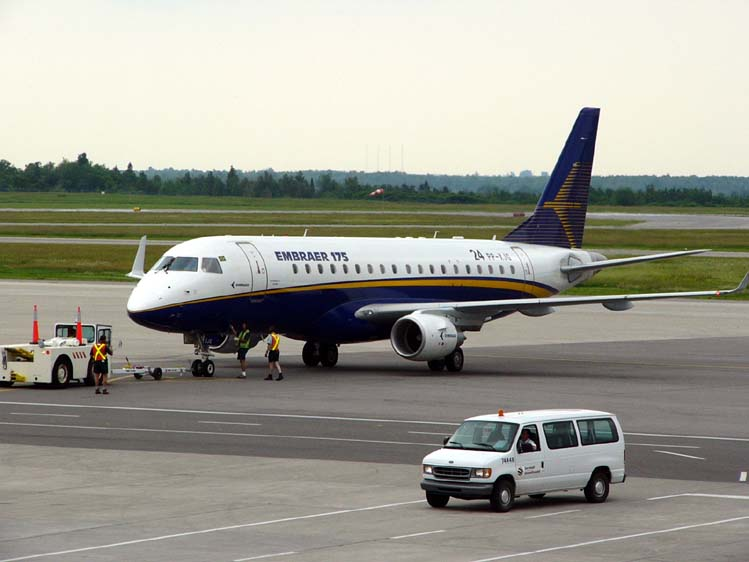
Embraer Aircraft: the third largest aircraft manufacturer in the world, the company is headquartered at São José dos Campos

In contrast to the rural town in 1950s, today São José is an important manufacturing center and holds a large array of industries. Over 1,251 industries are in the municipality and nearby 49,000 inhabitants work for industries. The three main industries are automotive, oil/petrochemical and aerospace. There are significant pharmaceutical, consumer durables, chemical, and telecommunication companies in the city.

It is also known as the "Brazilian aeronautics capital" because it is home of CTA and one of the biggest aircraft manufacturers in the world, Embraer.

=== International trade ===
In 2014 São José dos Campos ranked as the 5th largest exporter, by value, of all Brazilian municipalities exporting US$4.6B worth of materials. In that year, between aircraft and aircraft parts categories, São José Dos Campos exported US$3.57B or 81.9% of the total exports of the municipality.

=== Service industry ===
Since the 1990s, the local economy has been evolving in a different direction. The manufacturing economy has been downsized or replaced by tertiary and quaternary sectors of industries.

For instance, the Entrepreneurial District of Chacaras Reunidas concentrates companies of micro, small and medium size, which are mainly the result of downsizing from old large local industries. Although most of these are industries, these companies provide service as well.

Two technological parks and five (one in project) business incubators have been created within universities or with industrial facilities.

There are incubators with technological start-up companies installed at Univap and at Henrique Lage Refinery of Petrobrás. The CTA houses other incubator, Incubaero, specialized in the aeronautical field.

Univap features a technological park with capacity for around 40 small to medium-sized innovating companies in the areas of materials, electronics and telecommunications, information technology, aerospace, energy, environment control, biotechnology, bioinformatics, chemical engineering, and software among others. A new technological park, managed by the municipality and the state government of São Paulo, will house two new think tanks: the Institute for Technological Research (IPT) and the ItecBio (Instituto de Tecnologias Biomédicas).

As a result of its geographical location, the city became an important distribution center, having several logistics providers. Activities like purchasing, transport, planning and warehousing have employed many people recently.

Commerce and real estate ventures have developed in the last years, reflecting the changes in the economy. For instance, the largest shopping mall in the region was an old manufacturing facility. Serving the region's population of approximately one million, the city is the regional hub for shopping and services for the Vale do Paraíba, the northern coast of São Paulo and southern Minas Gerais.

==== Shopping areas ====
All the major hypermarkets, supermarket chains and discount and department stores are in the city. The largest malls are:

- CenterVale Shopping;
- Shopping Colinas;
- Vale Sul Shopping;
- Shopping Calçadão;
- Shopping Centro;
- Shopping Esplanada;
- Shopping Jardim Oriente;
- Shopping Faro

Besides those malls, the most important commercial centers include:

- The Old Downtown area including:
  - Rua Sete de Setembro – Calçadão – a popular street shopping area.
  - Rua XV de Novembro – located in Praça Afonso Pena, the town square. This street was the main street in São José dos Campos in the 1950s and 1960s. On the weekends, handcraft exhibitions are held there and in other squares.
  - Other streets: Rua Rubião Júnior, Rua Vilaça, Rua Siqueira Campos and Rua Sebastião Hummel.
  - the Municipal Market (popular groceries, stores);

And newer areas such as:

- Avenida Francisco José Longo and Avenida Nelson D´Ávila (hotels and maintenance services);
- Avenida Nove de Julho (fashionable boutiques and restaurants)
- Rua Luis Jacinto (nightclubs and restaurants);
- Avenida São João (with a small mall with exquisite boutiques called Shopping Esplanada, as well as restaurants and schools);
- Avenida Adhemar de Barros, where there are schools and the Santos-Dumont Park.

The Vila Ema district has sites for nightlife including bars and restaurants.

== Notable people ==
- Casemiro (Football player)
- Yuri Alberto (Football player)
- Ricardo Goulart (Football Player)
- Fabíola Molina (Swimmer)
- Maisa Silva (Actress, singer)
- André de Azevedo (Rally driver)
- Cassiano Ricardo (poet)
- Pamela Rosa (Skateboarder)
- Evaristo Costa (journalist)

== Sister city ==
- (Japan) Kadoma, Osaka

A Japanese garden is open for visits within the Santos-Dumont Park, celebrating the sister cities.

== Religion ==
Christianity is present in the city as follows:

=== Catholic Church ===
The Catholic church in the municipality is part of the Roman Catholic Diocese of São José dos Campos.

=== Protestant Church ===
The most diverse evangelical beliefs are present in the city, mainly Pentecostal, including the Assemblies of God in Brazil (the largest evangelical church in the country), Christian Congregation in Brazil, among others. These denominations are growing more and more throughout Brazil.

== See also ==
- List of municipalities in São Paulo
