= Theoretical Chemistry Accounts =

- Discipline: Chemistry
- Language: English
- Edited by: Juan-Carlos Sancho-García

Publication details
- Former name: Theoretica Chimica Acta
- History: 1962–present
- Publisher: Springer Science+Business Media
- Frequency: Continuous
- Open access: Hybrid
- Impact factor: 1.8 (2026)

Standard abbreviations
- ISO 4: Theor. Chem. Acc.

Indexing
- CODEN: TCACFW
- ISSN: 1432-881X (print); 1432-2234 (web)
- LCCN: 2004233404

Links
- Journal homepage; Online archive

Theoretical Chemistry Accounts: Theory, Computation, and Modeling is a peer-reviewed scientific journal covering in theoretical, physical, quantum, and computational chemistry. It was established in 1962 as Theoretica Chimica Acta, obtaining its present name in 1998. The publisher is Springer Science+Business Media. According to the Journal Citation Reports, the journal has a 2025 impact factor of 1.8. The editor-in-chief is Juan-Carlos Sancho-García (University of Alicante).
