= Jacareí Futebol Clube =

Brazilian football club

Jacareí
- Full name: Jacareí Futebol Clube
- Nicknames: Jacaré do Vale (en: "Alligator of the Valley")
- Founded: 1 October 1998; 27 years ago
- League: Campeonato Paulista Série A4
- 2025: Paulista Série A4, 6th of 16
Home colours	Away colours

Jacareí Futebol Clube is a Brazilian football club based in Jacareí, São Paulo. They were founded on 1 October 1998, originally in São José dos Campos as "Clube Atlético Joseense".

== History ==
The club was established on 1 October 1998 as an alternative team for the citizens of São José dos Campos to support, who then had São José Esporte Clube at the first division of the Paulista Championship. To gain supporters faster, they started using the same colors of the city's flag, but due to its similarity with São José EC's, the blue was changed to black.

The team played amateur and youth category competitions until 2000, when in the next year they became a professional team and started in the sixth division of the Campeonato Paulista.

Being promoted in the same year, they played in the fifth division until 2004. With the extinction of the fifth tier, they played in the fourth division for most of their history with the exception of a brief period between 2013 and 2017, when they were promoted to the third division but later relegated back to the fourth tier. Also, in January 2014 they changed their name to "São José dos Campos Futebol Clube" to better identify with its city, however, due to being similar to São José EC's name, the citizens hated the change and lost their support and respect, which made the team change its name back to "Clube Atlético Joseense" in 2017. Around the same time period they also played the Copa Paulista for two times: 2013 and 2016.

In January 2026, under these conditions and also unable to play in Martins Pereira stadium due to its privatization by São José SAF's owners and the high rental price of the stadium, they were forced to move its location to Jacareí and rebrand to "Jacareí Futebol Clube".
