= Telesp =

Brazilian telephone company (1973–1998)

TELESP - Telecomunicações de São Paulo S.A.
- Type: Sociedade Anônima
- Industry: Telecommunications
- Founded: April 12, 1973
- Defunct: July 29, 1998
- Headquarters: São Paulo, Brazil
- Products: Fixed line
- Subsidiaries: Telesp Celular (sold to Portugal Telecom in 1998)

Telesp - Telecomunicações de São Paulo S.A. (in English: Telesp - São Paulo Telecommunications) was the telephony operator company of the Telecomunicações Brasileiras S.A. (Telebrás) system in the Brazilian state of São Paulo, successor to the CTB, later incorporating the Companhia de Telecomunicações do Estado de São Paulo (COTESP) and other smaller companies. It remained in operation from May 1973 until the privatization process in July 1998, when the Spanish company Telefónica acquired it, forming Telefônica Brasil, which in 2012 adopted the Vivo brand for its fixed-line operations.

Of the current 645 municipalities of the state of São Paulo, Telesp operated in all but 43, which were served by the companies CTBC Borda do Campo, CTBC Brasil Central and CETERP.

== History ==
=== Background ===
From the 1940s and 1950s onward, Brazilian cities, especially the major urban centers, had high pent-up demand for telephones because a set of technical and economic factors led the country's private telephone operators to stop investing in the expansion and modernization of telephone systems, causing serious friction with the granting authorities. Institutional changes in the sector effectively began in 1962 with the Brazilian Telecommunications Code and resulted in the creation of Embratel (1965), the intervention and nationalization of Companhia Telefônica Brasileira (1966), the creation of the Ministry of Communications (1967), and the creation of the Telebras system (1972), the latter promoting the unification of operators at the state level and eliminating the incompatibility that existed between the telephone systems of the time.

=== Predecessors ===
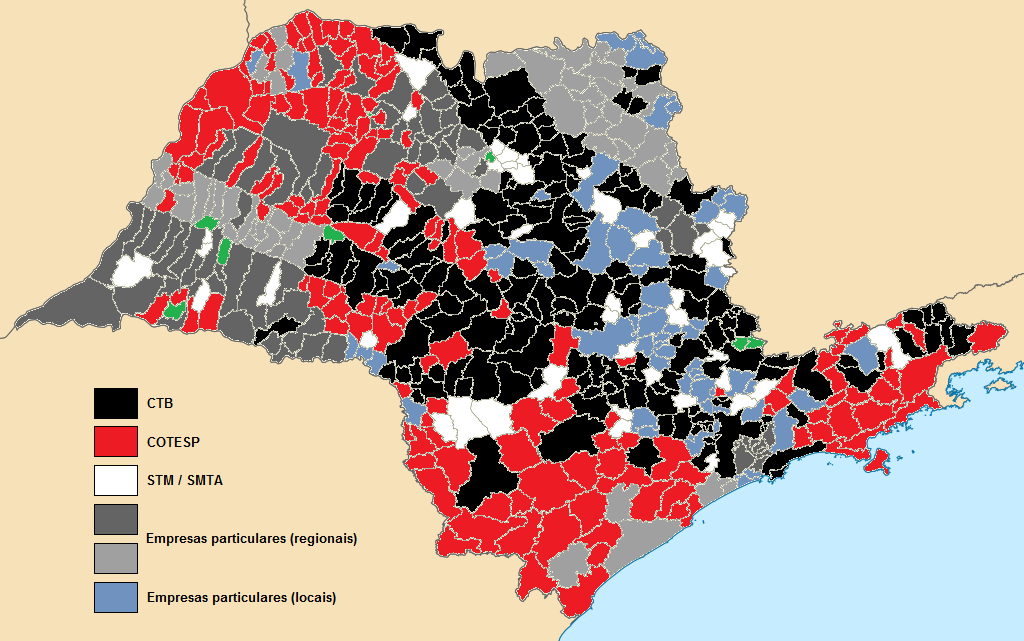
Telephone operators serving the state of São Paulo (1973).

List of the main telephone operators (public and private) that were incorporated and formed Telesp:

CTB

The company that gave rise to Telesp is through its São Paulo Operations Directorate (DOSP). It served São Paulo, Campinas, Santos and about 180 more cities throughout the state. It incorporated the following companies: S.T.M. Paulínia, S.T.M. Tabatinga, S.T.M. São José dos Campos, S.M.T.A. Araraquara, S.M.T.A. Taubaté, S.M.T.A. Guarujá, Soc. Telefônica da Estância (Serra Negra), S.T.M. Aguaí, S.T.M. Porto Ferreira, S.M.T.A. Rio Claro and Telefônica Lemense.

COTESP

Created in 1964 by the government of the state of São Paulo through the purchase of shares of the former Companhia Telefônica Tupi, it served about 170 cities. It incorporated the telephone service of the Estrada de Ferro Campos do Jordão, the Central Telefônica de Cachoeira Paulista, the Telefônica Salto de Pirapora, and various municipal telephone systems (including S.M.T.A. Aparecida and the Telefônica Municipal de Caraguatatuba). Its concessions were transferred in 1973 and 1975 through an agreement.

S.T.M. / S.M.T.A.

Many cities had their own Municipal Telephone Systems (S.T.M.), almost all of which had obsolete manual exchanges. Some larger cities were able to obtain automatic exchanges; for this purpose, Municipal Automatic Telephone Services (S.M.T.A.) were created.

Main private operators:

Company	Tel. (thousands)	Locations served	Notes
Cia Telefônica Rio Preto	15.0	São José do Rio Preto and 28 more cities	incorporated the S.T.M. Adamantina; managed by CTB
Cia Paulista de Telecomunicações (CIPATEL)	13.8	Piracicaba	incorporated Telefônica Águas de São Pedro and the S.T.M. Rio das Pedras; managed by CTB
Empr. Telefônica Paulista	12.5	Presidente Prudente and 21 more cities	incorporated Empresa Telefônica Mirante; managed by CTB
Telefônica Jundiaí	12.5	Jundiaí; Itupeva; Várzea Paulista	managed by CTB
Companhia Rede Telefônica Sorocabana	11.8	Sorocaba; Votorantim	managed by CTB
Cia Telefônica Alta Paulista	7.7	Tupã and 17 more cities	
Cia Telefônica Suburbana Paulista (COTESPA)	7.4	Osasco	organized by Bradesco, replaced the S.T.M. Osasco
Telefônica de Limeira	6.3	Limeira; Cordeirópolis; Iracemápolis	
Telefônica Central Paulista	5.9	São Carlos	
Cia Telefônica do Litoral Paulista	5.7	São Vicente; Boqueirão; Cidade Ocian; Solemar; Vila Caiçara	
Cia Telefônica de Guarulhos	3.8	Guarulhos	managed by CTB
Telefônica Nacional	3.1	Catanduva; Catiguá; Itajobi; Santa Adélia; Urupês	
Empr. Telefônica Ararense	2.6	Araras	
Empr. Telefônica de Americana	2.3	Americana	
Empresa Melhoramentos de Andradina (EMA)	1.9	Andradina; Castilho; Ilha Solteira; Pereira Barreto	managed by COTESP
Cia Telefônica de Valinhos	1.8	Valinhos	
Cia Telefônica de Ourinhos	1.7	Ourinhos	
Telefônica Pirassununga	1.6	Pirassununga	
Telefônica Pinhal	1.5	Espírito Santo do Pinhal	
Telefônica Barbarense	1.3	Santa Bárbara d'Oeste	
Cia Telefônica de Atibaia	1.2	Atibaia; Bom Jesus dos Perdões	
Cia Telefônica de Pindamonhangaba	1.2	Pindamonhangaba	
Empr. Telefônica Irmãos Camargo	1.2	São José do Rio Pardo	
Cia Telefônica de Itanhaém	1.1	Itanhaém; Iguape; Jacupiranga; Juquiá; Mongaguá	
Telefônica Jacareí	1.1	Jacareí	managed by CTB
Cia Telefônica Média Mogiana	1.0	Casa Branca; Itobi; Santa Cruz das Palmeiras; Tambaú	incorporated Empresa Telefônica Palmeirense and the S.T.M. Itobi; managed by CTB

=== Creation of Telesp ===
Formed as a subsidiary of Telebras on 12 April 1973, it began operational activities on 31 May 1973 with the incorporation of the assets of Companhia Telefônica Brasileira in the state of São Paulo.

Telesp was accredited as a holding company in the state by Ordinance No. 369 of 31 May 1973, in accordance with the guidelines and the policy of unifying the telephone system adopted by the Ministry of Communications, since the telephone system was granted at the time to several operators, both private and public.

== Expansion ==
=== Integration of state telephony ===
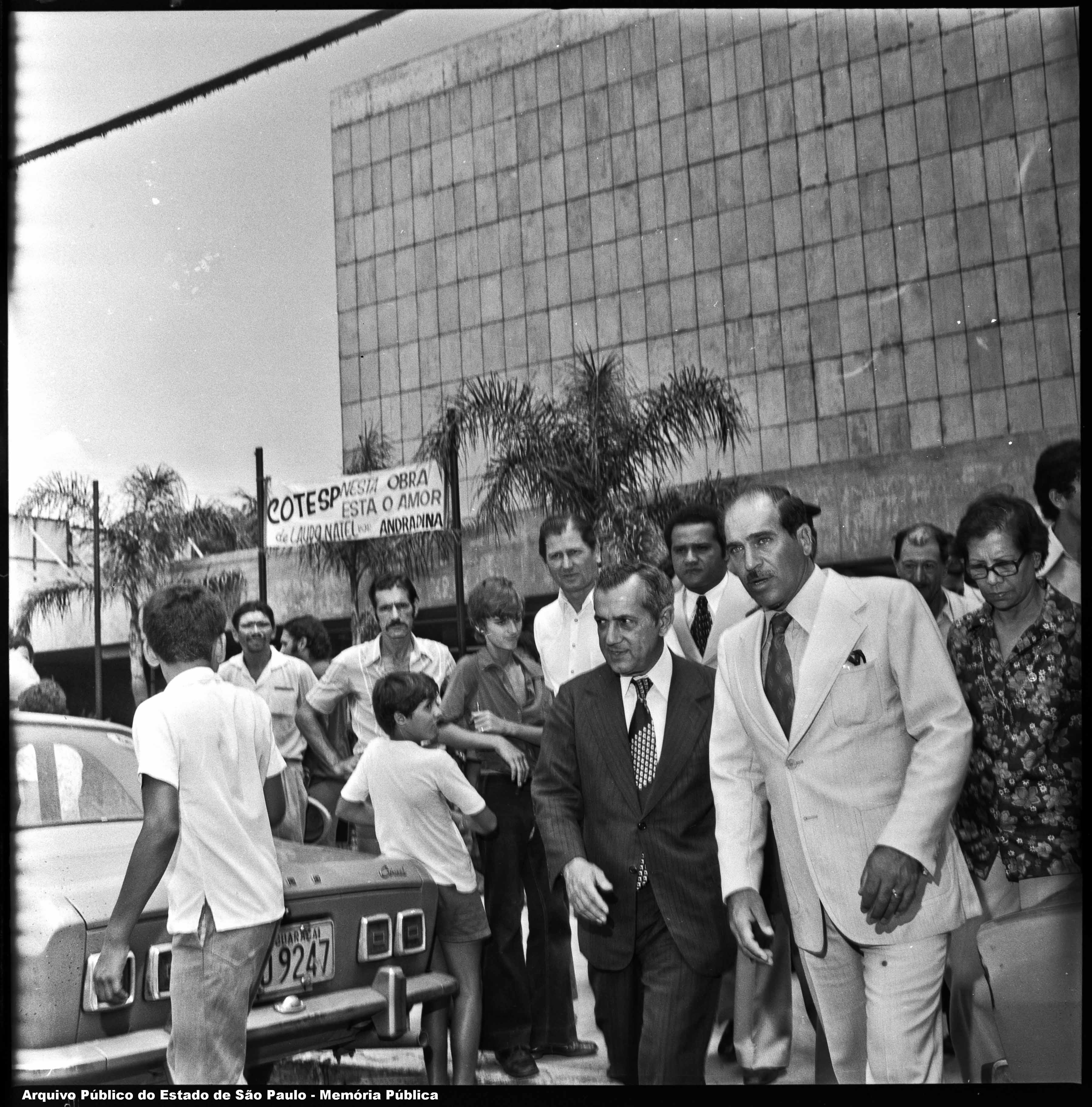
Inauguration of the telephone exchange in Andradina by COTESP (1975).

After its creation in April 1973, the processes of incorporation, expropriation, acquisition of holdings, or transfer of concession of the other operators existing in the state were gradual, from June 1973 until the beginning of 1980, with Teleoesp remaining last; its concession was revoked in July 1987. In cases of company incorporation, Telesp would first acquire a controlling interest or become a shareholder and only then incorporate it. The only exception was Companhia Telefônica da Borda do Campo, whose controlling interest Telesp acquired but kept under separate administration without incorporation.

1973

- Incorporation: Empresa Telefônica Paulista, Cia. Telefônica Rio Preto, Cia. Telefônica Média Mogiana and S.T.M. Porto Ferreira, Cia. Telefônica de Vinhedo and Telefônica Jacareí, Cia. Telefônica de Atibaia
- Acquisition of holdings: Empresa Telefônica Monte Mor, Telefônica Águas de São Pedro, S.T.M. Charqueada and S.T.M. Embu-Guaçu, S.M.T.A. São João da Boa Vista, S.T.M. João Ramalho and S.T.M. Ribeirão do Sul, Empresa Telefônica Sumaré, S.T.M. Vargem Grande do Sul, S.T.M. Monte Alto, Empresa Telefônica Dourado and S.T.M. Anhumas
- Transfer of concession: S.T.M. Elias Fausto, S.T.M. Ariranha, S.T.M. Marabá Paulista, S.T.M. Pirangi, S.T.M. Santo Expedito, S.T.M. Morungaba, S.T.M. Cabreúva, S.T.M. Santo Antônio do Jardim, S.T.M. Mairiporã, S.T.M. Ipeúna, COTESP (urban services in 89 locations), S.T.M. Paraíso, S.T.M. Luís Antônio, S.T.M. Dumont, S.T.M. Alfredo Marcondes and S.T.M. Nazaré Paulista

1974

- Incorporation: Telefônica Fartura, Telefônica Jundiaí and Cia. Telefônica de Guarulhos, Empresa Telefônica de Cosmópolis, Empresa Telefônica Cammarosano and Empresa Telefônica Santa Cruz da Conceição
- Acquisition of holdings: S.T.M. Artur Nogueira and S.T.M. Rio das Pedras, Telefônica Botelhos, S.T.M. Conchal, S.T.M. Divinolândia and S.T.M. São Sebastião da Grama, S.M.T.A. Lins, S.T.M. Araçoiaba da Serra, S.M.T.A. Guaratinguetá, S.T.M. Itaí and S.T.M. Taquarituba
- Transfer of concession: S.T.M. Bofete, S.T.M. Borborema, S.T.M. Iperó and S.T.M. Taiaçu

1975

- Incorporation: Telefônica Pinhal, Telefônica Nacional, Telefônica Descalvado and Cia. Telefônica Alta Paulista, Empresa Telefônica Tibiriçá Feio
- Acquisition of holdings: S.T.M. Bálsamo, S.T.M. Nova Europa and S.T.M. Palestina
- Transfer of concession: COTESP (urban services in 86 locations), S.T.M. Jarinu and S.T.M. Paranapanema
- Indirect extinction: Empresa Telefônica de Jaguariúna

1976

- Incorporation: Telefônica Barbarense and COTESP, Cia. Telefônica do Litoral Paulista and Empresa Telefônica de Americana, Telefônica Pirassununga, Telefônica de Limeira, Cia. Telefônica Santa Rita, Cia. Telefônica Suburbana Paulista and Empresa Melhoramentos de Andradina, Cia. Telefônica de Ourinhos, Cia. Telefônica de Itanhaém, Cia. Telefônica de Pindamonhangaba, Cia. Telefônica de Valinhos and Empresa Telefônica Ararense, Telefônica Central Paulista, Empresa Telefônica Irmãos Camargo and Cia. Rede Telefônica Sorocabana
- Acquisition of holdings: Telefônica Anhanguera, Cia. Telefônica de Caieiras, Telefônica de Nova Odessa, Telefônica Patrocínio Paulista, Empresa Telefônica Paulista (Bariri) and Empresa Telefônica Tapiratiba
- Indirect extinction: Empresa Telefônica Coração de Jesus

1977

- Incorporation: CIPATEL
- Acquisition of holdings: Cia. Telefônica Registro and Telefônica Sul Paulista, in addition to municipal telephone services in 89 locations
- Indirect extinction: Empresa Telefônica Mogiana

1978

- Acquisition of holdings: CETELVI and Concessionária Telefônica Figueira e Guerra

1979

- Acquisition of holdings: Empresas Telefônicas Reunidas de Igarapava e Pedregulho

1980

- Expropriation: Telefônica União

1987

- Transfer of concession: Telecomunicações do Oeste Paulista

=== Exchanges with other operators ===
The cities of Paraty and Sapucaí-Mirim (former COTESP concession) were transferred to Telerj and Telemig respectively. Telesp also operated in Fronteira, a city that lacked its own telephone exchange, with its telephones connected to the exchange in Icém. In 1997, it began to be served by Companhia Telefônica do Brasil Central.

=== Operators not incorporated ===
Some operators were not acquired by Telesp or by its incorporated companies, such as Cia. Telefônica Alta Mogiana (Orlândia), Cia. Telefônica de Franca, Empresa Telefônica de Buritizal, Empresa Telefônica de Cajuru, Empresa Telefônica de Ituverava, S.T.M. Guaíra, S.T.M. Jardinópolis and Telefônica Intermunicipal (Batatais), all incorporated by Companhia Telefônica do Brasil Central, and Telefônica Mogi das Cruzes, incorporated directly by Companhia Telefônica da Borda do Campo. The only operator that remained active in the state without being incorporated by any other was Centrais Telefônicas de Ribeirão Preto.

== Operational structure ==
Because the company operated throughout the state, it was managed through a decentralized hierarchical structure, with its administrative headquarters in the capital. For marketing services and providing customer support, Telesp was divided into six regional management areas, two in Greater São Paulo and four in the interior.

=== Administrative headquarters ===
Its first administrative headquarters was the Sete de Abril Complex, located at Rua Sete de Abril, 309 – República, which had been the headquarters of the CTB's Diretoria de Operação São Paulo (DOSP). Its principal building is the Edifício Sete de Abril, an Art Deco property designed by Ramos de Azevedo in partnership with Severo & Villares at the renowned Escritório Técnico Ramos de Azevedo, and whose facade was listed in 1992. Its corporate headquarters, meanwhile, was on the 4th floor of the Edifício Itália, at Avenida São Luís, 50 – República. In 1975, the company's new headquarters building was inaugurated at Rua Martiniano de Carvalho, 851 – Paraíso, with 22 floors. Its construction had begun in 1972 under CTB, after the demolition of the former Avenida telephone exchange, installed on the site in 1920 and deactivated in 1969. After the move, the buildings on Rua Sete de Abril and Rua Basílio da Gama, which together form the Sete de Abril Complex, continued to be used as a customer service center for subscribers. It is currently the second in São Paulo to receive a permit to carry out a retrofit under the Requalifica Centro program law. After being closed for more than a decade, it will be reopened under the name "Basílio 177", as an apartment condominium with an open gallery of shops and restaurants.

=== Presidents ===
- 1973–1979: The first Telesp board took office in April 1973, with Antonio Salles Leite as president. Until then, he had been CTB's economic-financial director, and he remained in office during the governments of Médici and Geisel.
- 1979–1985: Under the Figueiredo government, a new board took office in April 1979, with Carlos de Paiva Lopes as president; he had been vice-president in the previous administration.
- 1985–1990: A new board took office in March 1985 during the Sarney government, with Antonio Ignacio de Jesus as president; he had been the economic-financial director in the previous administration.
- 1990–1992: Oswaldo Lopes do Nascimento Filho and Marco Antonio Castello Branco, during the Collor government.
- 1992–1995: Waldemar Fernandes Neves, during the governments of Itamar Franco and Fernando Henrique.
- 1995–1998: Still under the Fernando Henrique government, the last Telesp board took office in July 1995, with Carlos Eduardo Sampaio Doria as president.

=== Regional management areas ===
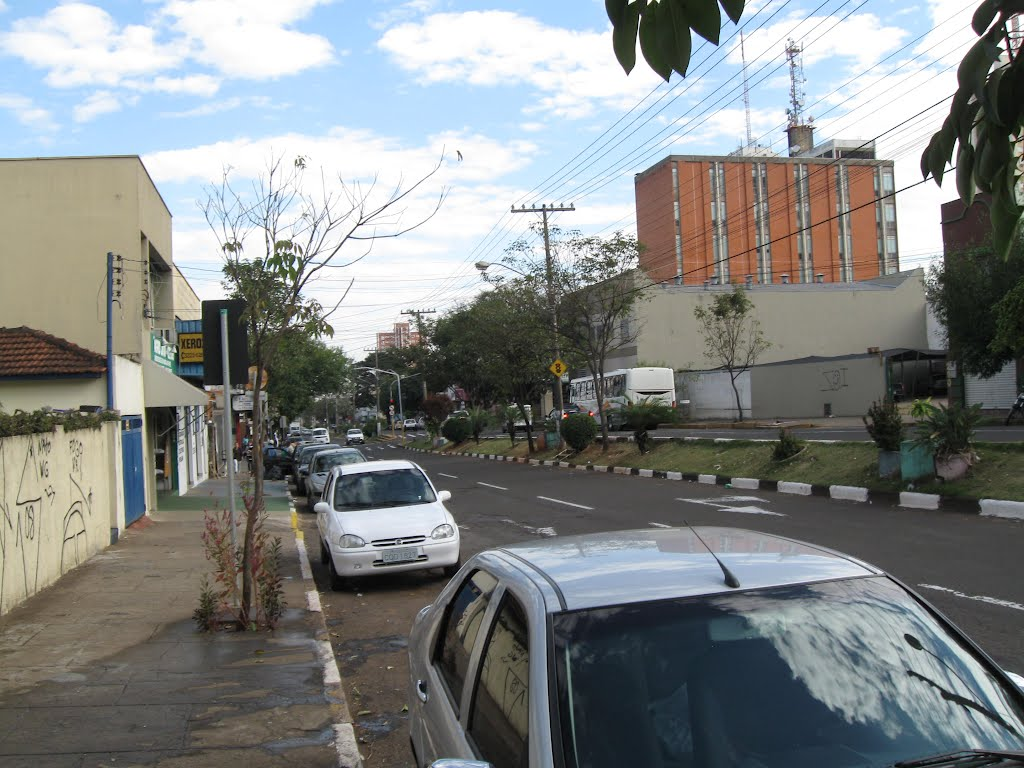
Telephone exchange in Presidente Prudente, headquarters of District OB2.

The purpose of a regional management area was to market and operate telecommunications services, and to manage, operate, maintain, and control telecommunications systems and their supporting activities. The six regional management areas were São Paulo East (OL) and São Paulo West (OW), created in 1979 through the division of the regional unit headquartered in São Paulo; Center-South (OA), created in 1976 with headquarters in Campinas; Center-West (OB), created in 1977 with headquarters in Bauru; North (OT), created in 1978 with headquarters in São José do Rio Preto; and Southeast (OS), created in 1979 with headquarters in Santos. The regional management areas were divided into sectors, called operational districts; each had a coverage area composed of one or more tertiary areas. In the most important cities of each district, there were Telesp Service Posts, where it was possible to make calls, buy tokens and phone cards, send and receive facsimile, consult telephone directories, etc. There were also Telesp Customer Service Stores, strategically distributed across the state's main cities and organized to offer every type of service that could not be provided through telephone support.

Regional management areas and districts
Regional management area	District	Tertiary area	Locations with service (Service Post/Store)
São Paulo East	OL1 - Consolação	11	City center, East Zone, North Zone, Guarulhos
São Paulo East	OL2 - Penha	11	City center, East Zone, North Zone, Guarulhos
São Paulo East	OL3 - Ipiranga	11	City center, East Zone, North Zone, Guarulhos
São Paulo East	OL4 - Anhangabaú	11	City center, East Zone, North Zone, Guarulhos
São Paulo East	OL5 - Vila Gustavo	11	City center, East Zone, North Zone, Guarulhos
São Paulo East	OL6 - Cumbica	11	City center, East Zone, North Zone, Guarulhos
São Paulo West	OW1 - Vila Mariana	11	West Zone, South Zone
São Paulo West	OW2 - Campo Belo	11	West Zone, South Zone
São Paulo West	OW3 - Jabaquara	11	West Zone, South Zone
São Paulo West	OW4 - Lapa	11	West Zone, South Zone
São Paulo West	OW5 - Palmeiras	11	West Zone, South Zone
São Paulo West	OW7 - Campo Limpo	11	West Zone, South Zone
São Paulo West	OW6 - Osasco	11	Osasco; Cotia, Embu, Embu-Guaçu, Itapecerica da Serra, Itapevi, and São Roque
Center-South	OA1 - Campinas	192	Campinas, Águas de Lindóia, Indaiatuba, Paulínia, Serra Negra, and Valinhos
Center-South	OA2 - Jundiaí	11	Jundiaí, Atibaia, Bragança Paulista, Itatiba, Itu, Mairiporã, and Salto
Center-South	OA3 - Rio Claro	195	Rio Claro, Araras, Leme, Pirassununga, and Porto Ferreira
Center-South	OA4 - Sorocaba	152, 155	Sorocaba, Itapetininga, Porto Feliz, and Tatuí; Itapeva, Apiaí, Capão Bonito, and Itararé
Center-South	OA5 - Piracicaba	194	Piracicaba, Águas de São Pedro, Americana, Capivari, Limeira, Nova Odessa, Rio das Pedras, Santa Bárbara d'Oeste, and São Pedro
Center-South	OA6 - São João da Boa Vista	192, 196	Itapira, Mogi Guaçu, and Mogi Mirim; São João da Boa Vista, Casa Branca, Espírito Santo do Pinhal, Mococa, and São José do Rio Pardo
Center-West	OB1 - Bauru	142, 146, 147, 149	Bauru, Agudos, Lençóis Paulista, and Pederneiras; Jaú and Barra Bonita; Avaré; Botucatu and São Manuel
Center-West	OB2 - Presidente Prudente	182, 183	Presidente Prudente, Presidente Epitácio, and Presidente Venceslau; Assis and Paraguaçu Paulista
Center-West	OB3 - Marília	143, 144, 145	Ourinhos, Piraju, and Santa Cruz do Rio Pardo; Marília, Garça, and Tupã; Lins and Promissão
Southeast	OS1 - Santos	132	Santos, Bertioga, Cubatão, Guarujá, and Vicente de Carvalho
Southeast	OS2 - Praia Grande	132, 138	Praia Grande, Itanhaém, Mongaguá, Peruíbe, and São Vicente; Registro and Iguape
Southeast	OS3 - São José dos Campos	123, 124	São José dos Campos and Jacareí; Caraguatatuba, São Sebastião, and Ubatuba
Southeast	OS4 - Taubaté	122, 125	Taubaté, Caçapava, Campos do Jordão, and Pindamonhangaba; Guaratinguetá, Aparecida, and Cruzeiro
North	OT1 - São José do Rio Preto	172, 173, 175	São José do Rio Preto; Barretos and Bebedouro; Catanduva
North	OT2 - Araçatuba	186, 187, 188, 189	Araçatuba, Birigui, and Penápolis; Andradina and Ilha Solteira; Dracena; Adamantina
North	OT3 - Araraquara	162, 163, 166, 167	Araraquara and São Carlos; Jaboticabal; Sertãozinho
North	OT4 - Votuporanga	174, 176	Votuporanga and Fernandópolis; Jales

=== Locations served ===
Through 1992, its operating area covered 532 cities. After the creation of new municipalities, the operating area increased to 583 cities in 1993 and 602 cities in 1997, serving about 30 million people in the state of São Paulo.

== Services ==
=== Fixed-line telephony ===
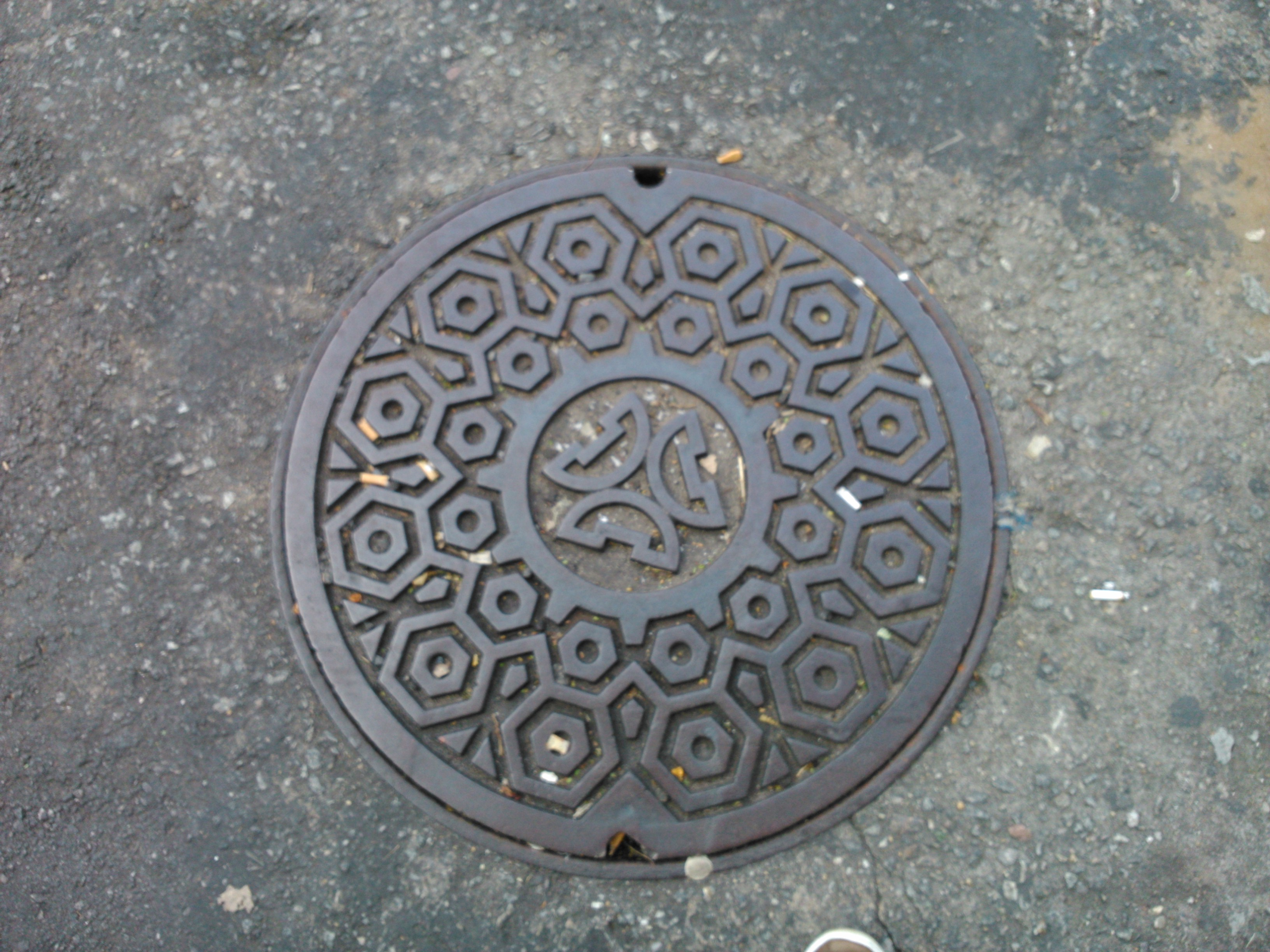
Manhole cover with the Telesp logo.

Main services provided:

- Local calls, long-distance calls via Direct Distance Dialing (DDD), and international calls via international direct dialing (DDI)
- Direct Inward Dialing (DDR): a service implemented in the 1970s, serving condominiums and larger companies
- Collect call (DDC): service inaugurated in 1982
- Toll-free dialing (DDG): 0800 service, implemented in the 1980s
- Features of CPA telephone exchanges: implemented gradually beginning in 1982, offering users new telephone-service features that were then unprecedented, including call transfer, call waiting, teleconference, abbreviated dialing, long-distance call blocking, dedicated line, and do-not-disturb service
- Telecard: launched in 1982, a card that allowed calls to be made without tokens or a phone card, with no payment at the time of the call; charges were debited to a telephone bill designated by the subscriber
- Disque 200: service inaugurated in 1983, used to provide varied information on different topics
- Modem: service inaugurated in 1984, equipment that turned any telephone into a receiving and transmitting hub for computer data via a video terminal
- Areafone: service inaugurated in 1984, aimed at high-traffic subscribers to reduce call costs
- Local calls to conurbated cities: service inaugurated in 1986 in the São Paulo, Campinas, and Santos areas

=== Public telephones ===
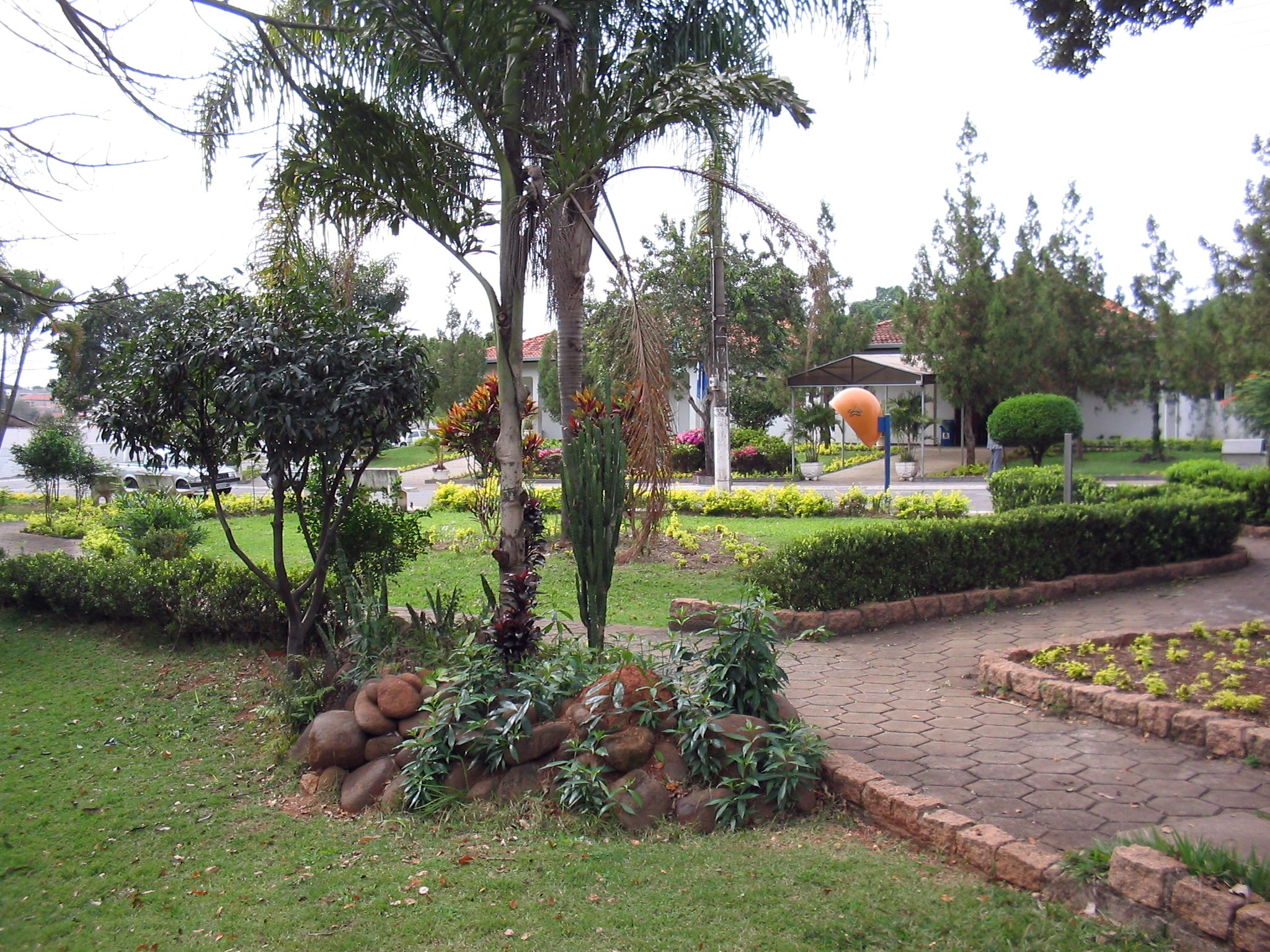
Square in Cosmópolis with a Telesp orelhão.

At first, the public telephones provided by Telesp were the "yellow orelhões" (with red telephone handsets that used telephone tokens), used to make local or long-distance calls to cities and localities within the same tariff area. These orelhões were installed in 1972 by CTB.

In 1975, the "blue orelhões" appeared (with blue telephone handsets that worked with DDD tokens), used to place direct long-distance calls to all cities and localities already integrated into the DDD system, or to others with operator assistance.

There were also "semi-public telephones" installed in establishments accredited as bars, restaurants, hotels, and bakeries; they functioned as both a public telephone and an ordinary telephone, thanks to a selector switch on the device.

In peripheral neighborhoods of large cities, as well as in rural neighborhoods that lacked telephony, there were so-called "vilafones", devices that made and received local and long-distance calls, installed in commercial establishments with easy public access.

To serve low-income populations, Telesp began installing orelhões in public housing developments in 1981. Also in 1981, the first public telephones for people with physical disabilities began to be installed. The first "community orelhão", a public telephone that made and received calls, was installed in August 1982 in the favela of Vila Prudente.

Another type of public telephone was "Falefácil", an alternative to "semi-public" phones, because it was a telephone with no dial or keys, only an indicator of minutes used; the person who placed the call was the responsible party at the establishment where the device was installed. Implemented starting in 1986.

Later, many orelhões were replaced by concrete cabins with clear tempered glass. The cabins were first tested in the cities of São Paulo, Santos, Guarujá, São Vicente, and Campinas, and then installed throughout the state, but they were not well received.

The telephone tokens used in public telephones began to be replaced by telephone cards starting in 1993.

==== Symbol ====
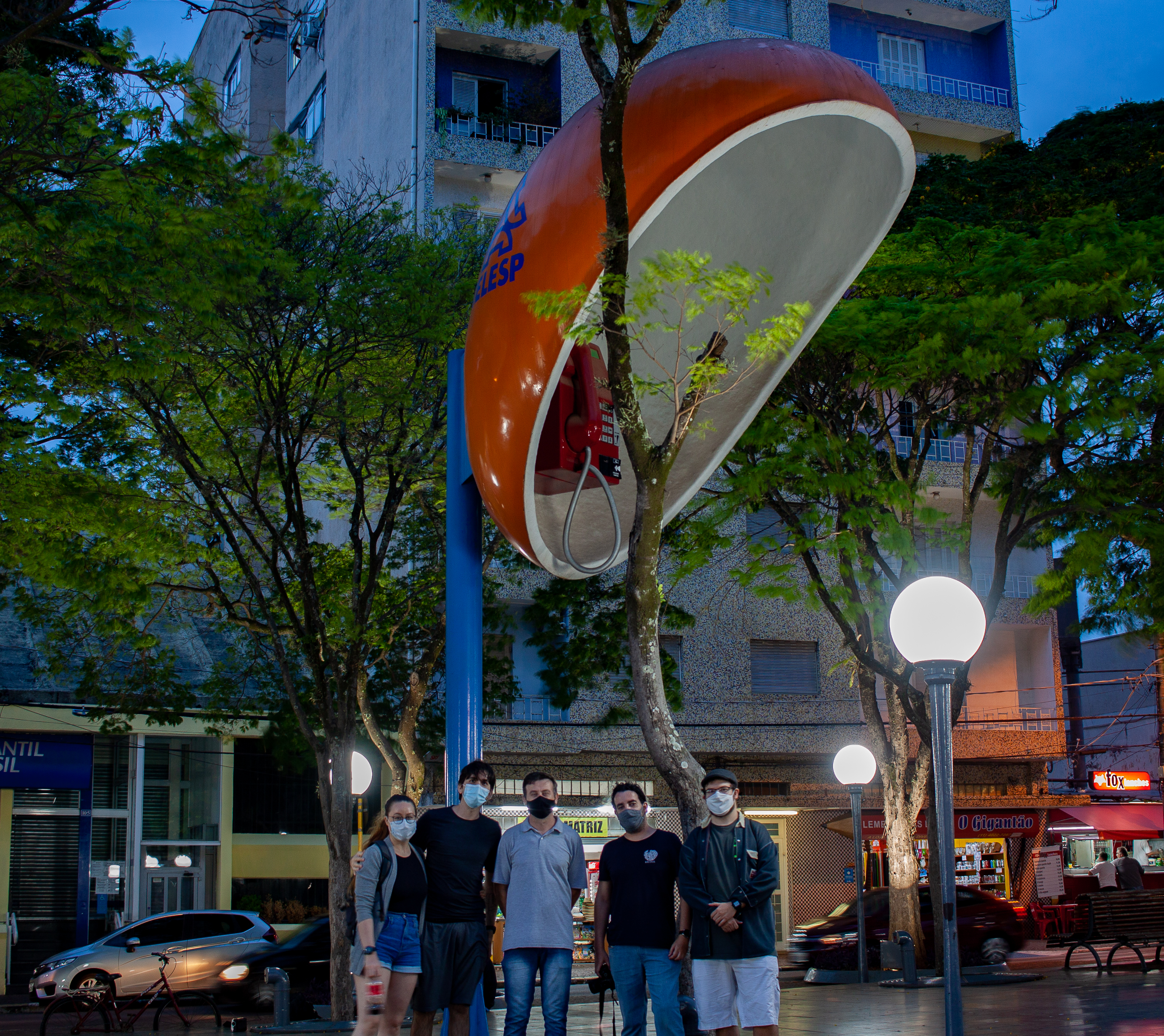
The famous Orelhão of Itu.

In 1973, the famous "Orelhão of Itu", seven meters tall, was donated by the Minister of Communications Hygino Corsetti and installed by Telesp in Praça da Matriz in Itu. It is one of the city's main tourist attractions and one of the reasons for its fame as the "city where everything is big", because the minister, honored with a banquet at the inauguration, ended his speech with the following words: O Brasil é grande, mas eu sei que Itu é maior.

==== Advertising ====
In 1979, Telesp launched the TV commercial "Vandalismo", better known as "Morte do Orelhão" because of the high rates of vandalism against the orelhões, and it is considered one of the major milestones in Brazilian advertising.

It was created by the renowned agency DPZ, and had significant cultural and social impact, as well as winning important awards for the agency and its creators Neil Ferreira and José Zaragoza, such as Gold at the Festival of the 5th Yearbook of the Clube de Criação de São Paulo in 1980, Best Special Project at the 3rd edition of the Rede Globo Profissionais do Ano Award in 1980, and the award for best special effects from the Hollywood Radio and Television Society NYC, because of the special effects conceived by Domingos Utimura, thereby obtaining international recognition.

=== Videotex ===
Established through Ordinance No. 107 of 26 May 1980 of the Ministry of Communications, under which Telesp was tasked with preparing a feasibility study for implementing a system intended to transmit information through the telephone network, with output on a television set or other alternatives, authorizing the installation in the city of São Paulo of a service for feasibility evaluation and the respective operational tests.

The contract to supply the equipment required for the pilot deployment of videotex was signed in 1981, with the experimental phase beginning in the first half of 1982. The service was officially inaugurated in December 1982, as Brazil's first experience in this field.

=== Cellular telephony ===
Telesp Celular was the mobile telephone operator of the Telecomunicações Brasileiras S.A. (Telebras) system in the state of São Paulo, a subsidiary of Telecomunicações de São Paulo S/A (TELESP). After being privatized it retained the same name until 2003, when it became known as Vivo.

==== Origin ====
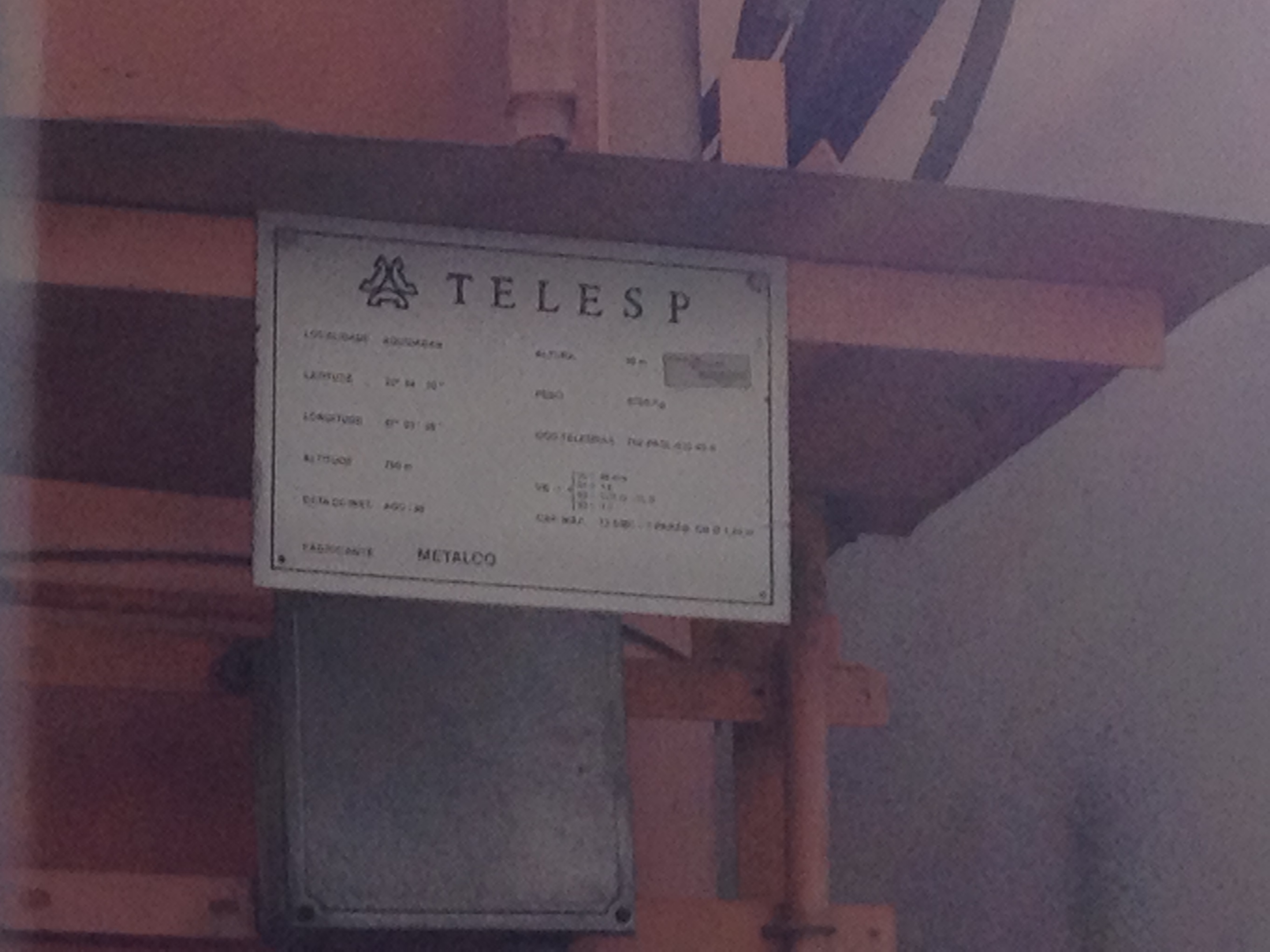
Information sign for a cellular network antenna.

Initially a superintendence within Telesp, it began operations on August 6, 1993, in the analog system, at a time when cellular telephony was still being established in the country, being designated for the implementation and operation of the cellular telephone system in a concession area that included 620 municipalities.

It remained a subsidiary of Telesp until the privatization process carried out in July 1998.

Shortly before privatization, Telesp Celular established itself as the largest operator in Latin America, implementing cellular telephony in record time across the state, serving about 1.141 million subscribers in 371 municipalities at the time.

==== Privatization ====
As part of the controversial privatization process of the Telebras system in July 1998, Telesp and Telesp Celular were split. The former came under the control of Telefónica; the latter was acquired by Portugal Telecom.

In the year 2000, the shareholding composition of Telesp Celular was as follows:

- 44.78%: Portugal Telecom
- 40.22%: Portelcom (74.20% Portugal Telecom; 25.8% Ptelcom)

In 2000, Telesp Celular assumed the cellular operation of Centrais Telefônicas de Ribeirão Preto (CETERP), which had been acquired by Telefónica in an auction held in December 1999. In July 2001, Telesp Celular operated in 470 municipalities in its service area, then with 622 municipalities (the state of São Paulo has 645 municipalities; subtracting the 23 municipalities in the CTBC service area results in 622 municipalities).

Subsequently, Portugal Telecom, in a joint venture with Telefónica Mobile, combined its assets with Telefónica Mobile, and together they created Vivo in 2003.

In 2005, a corporate restructuring occurred that transformed Telesp Celular Participações into Vivo Participações, which extinguished and incorporated Tele Leste, Tele Sudeste, Tele Centro Oeste Celular (acquired in 2003), and CRT (acquired in 1996), companies under the control of Telefónica.

==== Technology used ====
In 1998, months before privatization, the implementation of the digital system began, using the CDMA (IS-95) system, used by the operator for the remainder of its existence. Its successor, Vivo, maintained this technology in operation until November 2012.

==== Market share ====
In 2003, Telesp Celular held a market share of 66% in its service area.

==== Promotions ====
Among the promotions carried out by Telesp Celular, three stand out: in 1999, the product Baby, o celular inteligente, which sought to incorporate a market that at the time (1999) still did not have access to cellular telephony through a prepaid product, without subscription and at low cost.

In the same year, Peg & Fale was launched, featuring a rechargeable system in which a certain amount was paid upfront, and the remainder in monthly recharges, with the total amount later converted into credits for the user. In 2001, Peg & Fale was segmented to appeal to football supporters of six São Paulo teams (Corinthians, Palmeiras, São Paulo, Santos, Guarani and Ponte Preta), with the creation of Peg & Fale Gol, with cellphone models in the teams' colors and with the clubs' crests.

==== Coverage area ====
Telesp Celular operated on Band A, in practically the entire state of São Paulo, except 23 municipalities in the region of Franca, whose operation was the responsibility of Companhia de Telecomunicações do Brasil Central (CTBC-Celular, today Algar Telecom Celular).

Although they used area codes 012 to 019 well before fixed telephony, the basic mobility areas of cellular telephony (compatible with the tariff areas of fixed telephony) had their own prefixes, although with the same DDD code.

The initial prefix series used were 97x and 98x; later, the 96x and 99x series were used; and finally, 93x (only in area 011), all composed of three digits.

From 1996 onward, cellphone prefixes in area 011 began to be changed to four digits, using the 99xx prefix series, the first four-digit cellular prefixes in Brazil.

Basic mobility areas with the original cellular prefixes
Mobility area	DDD	Prefixes
11-São Paulo	011	970, 971, 972, 973, 974, 975, 976, 977, 978, 979; 980, 981, 982, 983, 984, 985, 986, 987, 988, 989; 990, 991, 992, 995, 996; 930, 931, 932, 933, 934, 935, 936, 937, 938, 939
123-São José dos Campos	012	971, 972, 973, 978, 979; 963, 964
124-Caraguatatuba	012	974, 975
122-Taubaté	012	981, 982, 983, 984
125-Guaratinguetá	012	985, 986, 987
132-Santos	013	971, 972, 973, 974, 978, 979; 981, 982, 983, 984, 985, 986, 987; 961
138-Registro	013	975
142-Bauru	014	971, 972; 991, 992; 968
146-Jaú	014	973, 978
147-Avaré	014	974
149-Botucatu	014	975, 976
143-Ourinhos	014	982, 983
144-Marília	014	984, 986, 987; 961
145-Lins	014	985
152-Sorocaba	015	971, 972, 974, 977, 978; 982, 985, 986
155-Itapeva	015	975, 976
166-Ribeirão Preto (prefixes of CETERP and CTBC-Algar are not included)	016	971, 972, 973
167-Franca (prefixes of CTBC-Algar are not included)	016	974, 976
162-Araraquara	016	981, 982, 983, 984
163-Jaboticabal	016	985, 986
172-São José do Rio Preto	017	971, 972, 974; 991
173-Barretos (prefixes of CTBC-Algar are not included)	017	973
175-Catanduva	017	975, 976, 977
174-Votuporanga	017	981, 984
176-Jales (prefixes of CTBC-Algar from municipalities of MS are not included)	017	985
182-Presidente Prudente	018	971, 972, 973
183-Assis	018	975, 976
186-Araçatuba	018	981, 983, 986
187-Andradina	018	982
189-Adamantina	018	984
188-Dracena	018	985
192-Campinas	019	971, 972, 973, 974, 978, 979; 990, 991, 992, 993, 994, 995, 996, 997, 998; 961, 962, 963, 964, 965
196-São João da Boa Vista	019	975, 976, 977
194-Piracicaba	019	981, 982, 983, 987, 988, 989; 966, 968
195-Rio Claro	019	984, 985, 986; 967, 969

Subsequently, with the popularization of cellphones, numbering had to be expanded. Thus, when the digital system began to be implemented throughout the state in 1998, the 960x and 970x prefix series began to be used in areas 012 to 019.

Between 2000 and 2001, the prefixes of areas 012 to 019 that still had three digits were changed to four digits within the 97xx series.

From then on, mobility areas came to include all municipalities with the same DDD code, and their compatibility with fixed telephony tariff areas ceased to exist.

=== Internet ===
It included data communication and dial-up Internet services.

=== Telephone museum ===
The Museu do Telefone de São Paulo, inaugurated on 13 April 1977 as part of Telesp's anniversary celebrations, arose from the desire of president Antonio Salles Leite for there to be, in São Paulo, a museum dedicated to the device that revolutionized global communication. To publicize it, the museum appeared on the cover of the capital's subscriber telephone directory the following year.

Its collection consisted of objects belonging to Telesp and, chiefly, of the acquisition of the private collection of gaúcho Carlos Becker, considered at the time the fourth-largest private collection of telephones in the world. Combining the collections, the museum was one of the most important in the world, consisting of about 3,000 objects (including countless telephones), 100,000 black-and-white photos, 6,000 digitized photos, telephone directories, telephone cards, and various documents.

Located on the ground floor of Telesp's headquarters building and occupying more than 700 square meters, it became a major cultural attraction in the city. However, it has been closed for years and is inaccessible to the public.

=== Addresses ===
The first official list of addresses of Telesp for the city of São Paulo was the 80/82 edition, published by LTB, since the last edition had been published in 1972, when the capital was still served by CTB; its publication was then discontinued due to the high production costs.

LTB also published the 82/84 edition, when the list was discontinued again. It resumed publication starting with the 88/89 edition, this time by OESP Gráfica, and from then on the São Paulo address list began to be published regularly every two years.

In the interior, the address lists were published together with the subscriber lists and the classified directory. Starting with the 85/86 edition, they began to be published separately and only for the main cities, as required by regulation. But there were exceptions, such as List 107–Guarulhos, which combined in the same volume the subscriber, address, and classified lists.

Lists published included 130–Santos, 134–São José dos Campos, 141–Campinas, 151–Piracicaba, 152–Limeira, 153–Americana, 154–Santa Bárbara d'Oeste, 156–Jundiaí, among others.

== Telephone directories ==
=== Subscribers/classified ===
Editions 73/74 to 1977–77/78

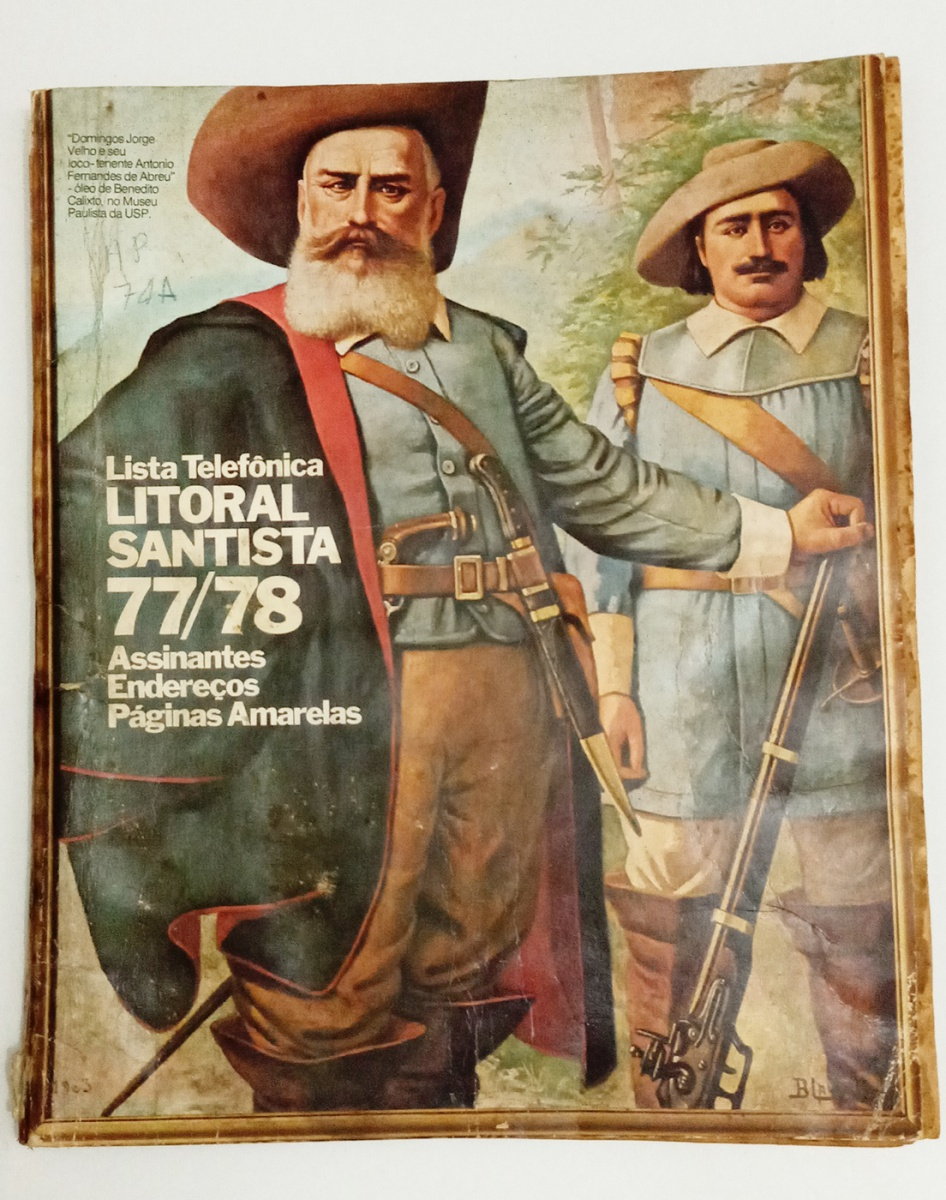
Lista Telefônica Litoral Santista – thematic series (1977–78 edition).

The official telephone directories of the city of São Paulo were published by the Editora de Guias LTB since the period when it was still served by the Companhia Telefônica Brasileira, namely the Lista Telefônica Assinantes and the Páginas Amarelas. For the interior, the directories were published by LTB (Vale do Paraíba, Norte Paulista, Litoral Santista, Leste Paulista and Sul Paulista), by LTP-Listas Telefônicas Paulista (Região Paulista, Região Sorocabana, Região Alta Paulista and Região Litoral) and by LTN-Lista Telefônica Nacional (Região Araraquarense and Região Noroeste). And for the companies not yet incorporated by Telesp, local telephone directories were published by various publishers, such as those of Sorocaba, Osasco, Guarulhos, Pindamonhangaba, Guaratinguetá, Espírito Santo do Pinhal, among others. But the relationship between LTB and Telesp began to deteriorate markedly from 1977 due to various factors, among them the noticeable decline in the quality and reliability of the directories published from 1975 onward, culminating in the very poor quality of the 1977 edition of the São Paulo Subscribers List, and the non-distribution of thousands of copies of that edition to subscribers, resulting from the fact that LTB was experiencing serious financial problems. From the 1977–77/78 edition onward, Telesp's telephone directories began to feature thematic series printed on the covers, starting with figures and places related to the Bandeirantes.

Editions 1978–78/79 to 1983–83/84

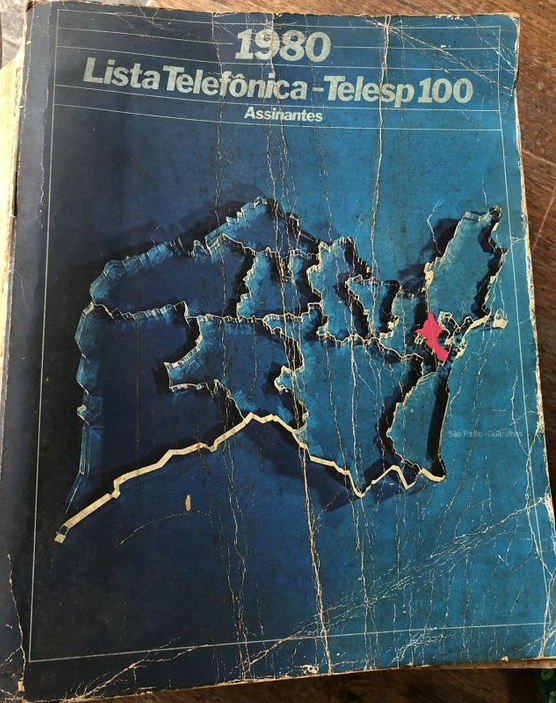
Lista Telefônica Telesp 100 – thematic series (1980 edition).

From the 1978–78/79 edition onward, the official telephone directories were standardized, each with a national code of Telebrás and coverage based on tertiary areas. For this purpose, the state's tertiary areas were grouped into 12 regions: São Paulo/Guarulhos, Osasco/Jundiaí, Santos, Baixada Santista, São José dos Campos, Campinas, Piracicaba, Bauru, Sorocaba, Araçatuba, São José do Rio Preto and Araraquara. Even with Telesp facing problems with LTB, the president of Telebras ordered the contract with this company to be extended until 1983, because it received government help through loans as a solution to its financial difficulties.

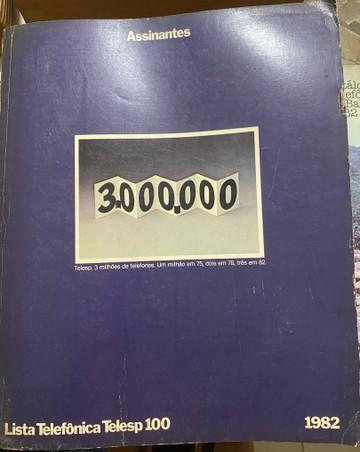
Lista Telefônica Telesp 100 – thematic series (1982 edition).

During this period, thematic series continued to be printed on the covers, including museums in the 1978–78/79 edition, the coffee route in the 1979–79/80 edition, the three million installed telephones in the 1982–82/83 edition, and the celebration of the company's tenth anniversary in the 1983–83/84 edition.

Period without publication To comply with the new regulation on publishing telephone directories (Decreto nº 88.221 de 07/04/1983 and Portaria nº 189 de 20/10/1983), Telesp would have to open tender processes to publish them after the contracts then in force ended. But in June 1983, before its end, LTB unilaterally terminated the contract with Telesp, considering it harmful to the company, even though it had numerous privileges that other publishers did not have. As a result, it stopped publishing the 1984 edition directories that were part of the contract, in addition to not distributing thousands of copies of the 1983 edition of the São Paulo/Guarulhos Subscribers List and of other regions. The termination compromised the production of new directories, causing significant harm to the entire population of the state of São Paulo. LTB wanted to go back, but Telesp had already accepted the termination of the contract, because it did not agree with the requirements the publisher wanted to be favored even more. At the same time, EBID, another company in the Grupo Gilberto Huber, began to publish guides under the registered brand Páginas Amarelas, distributing them in parallel with the official directories, creating a long legal dispute with Telesp that lasted almost eight years (from September 1983 to June 1991), with the courts ultimately guaranteeing the publisher's right to publish them. Thus, the requirement for tenders for new contracts and the legal problems with LTB caused the suspension of the publication of the 1984–84/85 and 1985 edition directories.

Editions 85/86 and 1986–86/87 In compliance with the new regulation, the invitation-letter system was used for the tenders, but only for publishers registered with Telebrás. The telephone directories were reorganized into 14 regions: List 130 was suppressed, and Lists 115, 150 and 160 were split, giving rise to Lists 155-Jundiaí and region, 145-Rio Claro and region and 165-Marília and region. In addition, the tertiary areas of Jaú, Avaré, and Botucatu ceased to be covered by List 170 and were integrated into List 160. In January 1984, Telesp began the tender process for the São Paulo/Guarulhos directories, and in August 1984 OESP Gráfica was contracted. Execution of the contract, with a five-year term, was suspended due to legal measures filed by the Editora de Guias LTB. The delay in publishing new directories led those then in circulation, compiled in 1982 and distributed in 1983, to an out-of-dateness that reached 70%. To find a solution still under the terms of the new regulation, Telesp requested and obtained from the Ministry of Communications permission to contract with the same publisher for one year to print the directories, which were to be distributed in mid-1985. But in November 1984, the process was again halted by legal measures. Recognizing the seriousness of the problem generated and seeking to minimize losses for users, in January 1985 the Ministry of Communications authorized Telesp to contract OESP Gráfica to publish the São Paulo/Guarulhos directories. LTB filed a new lawsuit, but in June 1985 Telesp obtained a favorable opinion given definitively by the courts. Meanwhile, users in these cities suffered from the lack of updated directories until the situation was normalized, with delivery of the Subscribers List, 1986 edition in December 1985 and of the Classified List, 86/87 edition in July 1986, marking the end of a directory out-of-dateness that had already lasted three years. Regarding the interior, in December 1984 several publishers were contracted on an emergency basis, for a period of one year, for the publication of the 85/86 and 1986 edition directories of 11 regions. Thus, the promise of distribution of directories in the regions of Campinas (OESP Gráfica); São José dos Campos (ABC LISTEL); Bauru (ECTB-Editora de Catálogos Telefônicos do Brasil); Santos, Rio Claro, Piracicaba and Jundiaí (LTP-Listas Telefônicas Paulista); Osasco, Marília, Sorocaba and Araraquara (LTN-Lista Telefônica Nacional) was fulfilled. The interior directories began to be distributed in July 1985. For printing the São Paulo/Guarulhos, Osasco and Campinas directories, a data transfer system to the publishers via magnetic files was implemented. With the implementation of this system, the subscriber complaint rate fell to 0.2%. Another novelty implemented on an experimental basis by Telesp in May 1986 was the electronic telephone directory service on videotext.

Editions 1987–87/88 and 1988–88/89 In June 1986, the legal problems regarding the São Paulo/Guarulhos directories were resolved once and for all, and the following telephone directories were contracted for a period of five years:

- OESP: 100-São Paulo Assinantes, 105-São Paulo Classificada, 107-Guarulhos

At the end of 1985, negotiations with publishers for the publication of new editions for the interior were concluded, and during 1986, for a period of four years, the following telephone directories were contracted:

- LTP: 131-Santos e região, 145-Rio Claro e região, 150-Piracicaba e região, 155-Jundiaí e região, 160-Bauru e região, 165-Marília e região
- LTN: 115-Osasco e região, 170-Sorocaba e região, 185-Araraquara e região
- ABC LISTEL: 135-São José dos Campos e região, 140-Campinas e região

For printing the Sorocaba, Piracicaba, Santos, São José dos Campos, Araraquara, and Marília directories, the data transfer system to publishers via magnetic files was introduced. And for the 88/89 edition, List 131 was split and suppressed, giving rise to Lists 132-Santos e região and 133-Registro e região. Still in 1986, publication of the 87/88 edition directories for the regions of Presidente Prudente and São José do Rio Preto was contracted on an emergency basis for a period of one year, and then in 1987, for a period of four years, the following telephone directories were contracted:

- LTN: 175-Araçatuba e região, 176-Presidente Prudente e região, 180-São José do Rio Preto e região, 181-Votuporanga e região

Editions 1989–89/90 to 1995–95/96

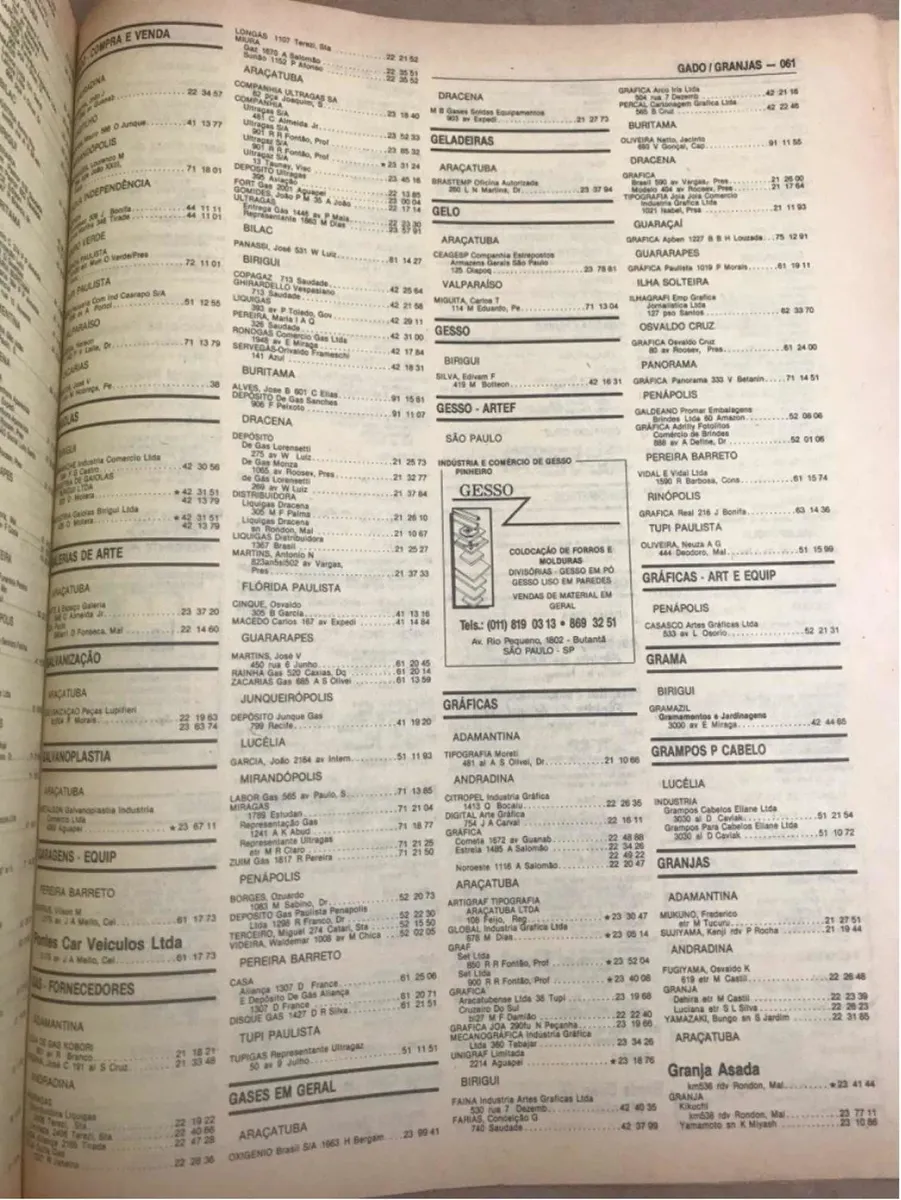
Lista Telefônica Telesp 175 – classified directory.

Once again, the directories were reorganized: for the 1989 edition, List 105 was divided, giving rise to Lists 104-São Paulo Classificada Consumidor and 105-São Paulo Classificada Empresa, and List 135 was split and suppressed, giving rise to Lists 136-Litoral Norte, 137-Alto Vale do Paraíba, and 138-Vale do Paraíba e Região Serrana. There was also a change in the roster of publishers: LISTEL incorporated LTP in October 1988 and considerably expanded its coverage in the state, and from the 1989 edition onward began publishing that publisher's directories, and in 1994 LTN came to be called EPIL – Editora Pesquisa e Indústria.

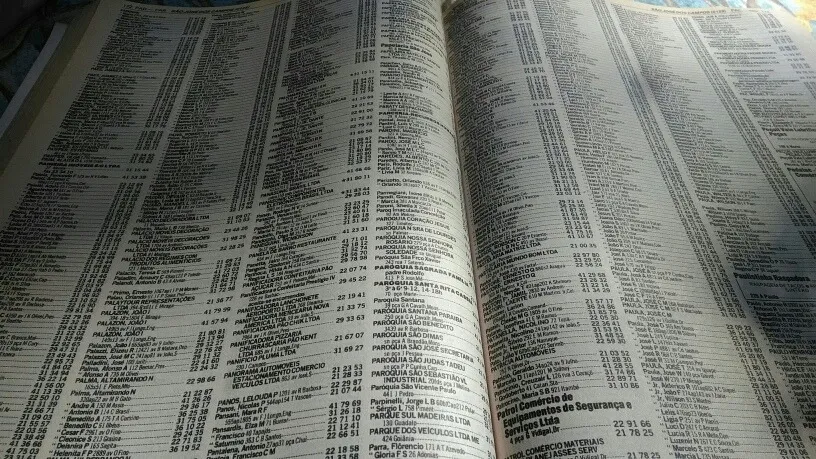
Lista Telefônica Telesp 138 – subscribers directory.

Editions 1996–96/97 to 1999 There was still one last reorganization in the directories: for the 1996 edition, Lists 115, 170, and 180 were split, giving rise to Lists 124-Barueri, São Roque e região, 125-Cotia, Itapecerica da Serra e região, 173-Região Sul Paulista, and 182-Barretos, Bebedouro, Catanduva e região, and for the 1997 edition, List 100 was divided, giving rise to Lists 100-São Paulo Assinantes Empresariais and 102-São Paulo Assinantes Residenciais. Finally, Telesp's telephone directories reached the internet in July 1997, and the 1999 edition was the last to be published by Telesp, with the 2000 edition already published by Telefônica.

=== Addresses ===
The first official Telesp address directory for the city of São Paulo was the 80/82 edition, published by LTB, since the last edition had been published in 1972, when the capital was still served by CTB, and its publication was then discontinued due to high production costs. LTB also published the 82/84 edition, when the directory was discontinued again. It returned to being published from the 88/89 edition onward, this time by OESP Gráfica, and from then on São Paulo's address directory came to be published regularly every two years. In the interior, address directories were published together with subscriber and classified directories. From the 85/86 edition onward, they were published separately and only for the main cities, as determined by the regulation. But there were exceptions, such as List 107-Guarulhos, which brought together in the same volume the subscriber, address, and classified directories. The directories 130-Santos, 134-São José dos Campos, 141-Campinas, 151-Piracicaba, 152-Limeira, 153-Americana, 154-Santa Bárbara d'Oeste, 156-Jundiaí, among others, were published.

== Telephone terminals ==
=== Expansion plans and shares ===
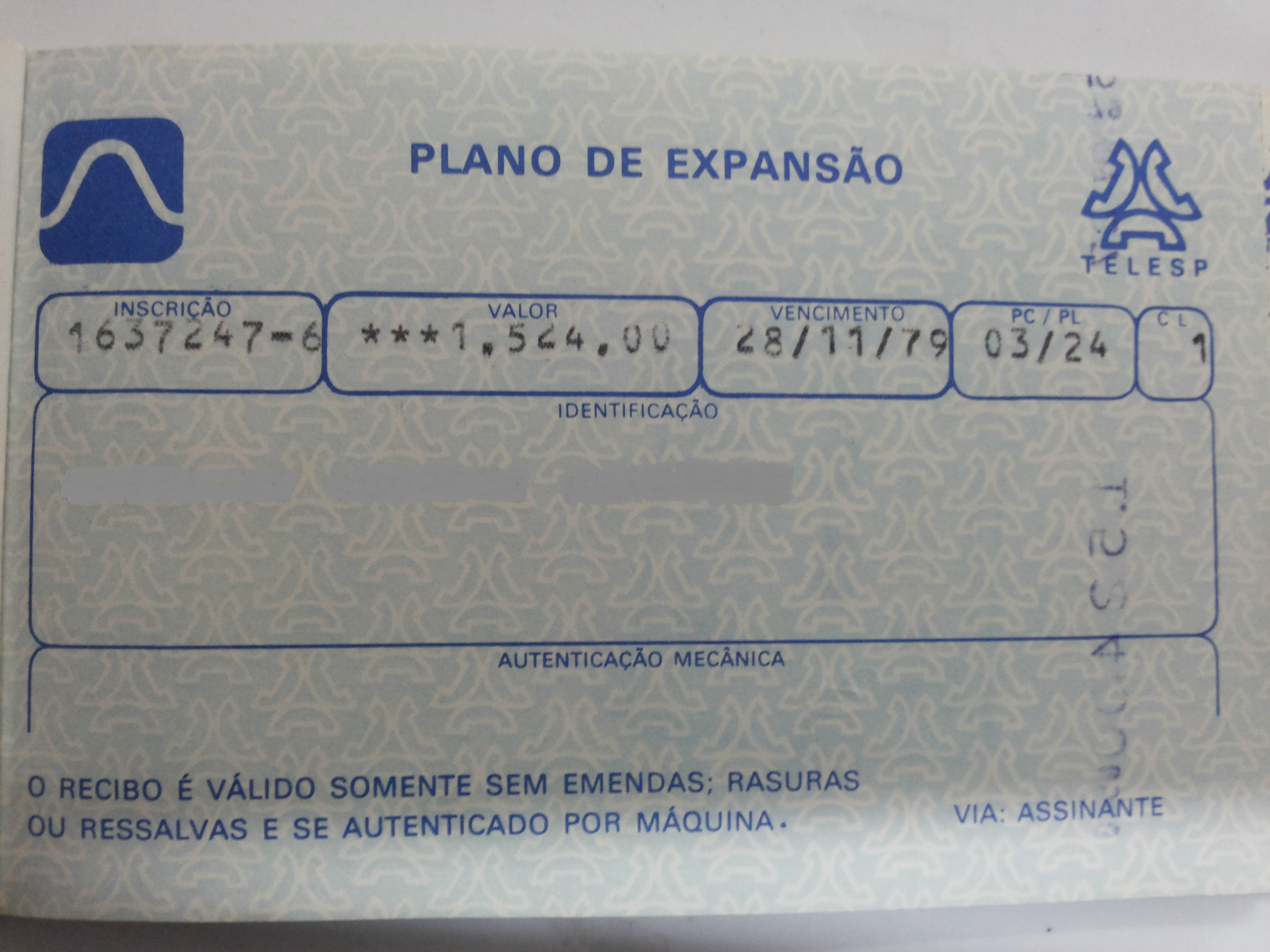
Telesp expansion plan (1970s)

In the Brazilian government's policy of expanding the telephone system, users advanced financial resources to fund it through the self-financing scheme for telephone lines, adopted in 1967 and unique worldwide. Thus, the user received shares of the company concessionaire for the public telecommunications service; that is, they were not only acquiring the line, but also becoming a shareholder of the company.

This was the expansion process for telephone companies: they increased their capital by issuing shares purchased by those interested in having a telephone. Then, the money was used to expand the telephone network and install the purchased lines. Between the sale of the expansion plan and the installation of the line, the process could take two years or more.

Those who purchased expansion plans from January 1973 to December 1974 and from January 1996 to June 1997 became shareholders of Telesp, while those who purchased expansion plans from January 1975 to December 1995 became shareholders of Telebras.

Only those who bought telephones via expansion plans had the right to shares. Those who bought the line from third parties, which was very common at the time, did not receive the shares; what was transferred was only the right to use the line, because the shares were not associated with the telephone line number but instead assigned to the first holder based on the registration number of the expansion plan carried out directly through Telesp's self-financing system, which held identifying data for the prospective subscriber. Thus, users who sold their lines remained shareholders and could also sell their shares, which they did very frequently.

This form of financing was abolished on 30 June 1997, under Ordinance No. 261 of 30 April 1997 of the Ministry of Communications. Still, subscribers who received shares and did not sell them remained shareholders in other companies after the system reorganization. Those who were shareholders of Telesp also received shares of Telesp Celular following the company's demerger. Shareholders of Telebras also received shares in the new companies after the demerger, such as Telesp and Embratel. Since 1998, changes have occurred, and those who were still shareholders of Telebras in May of that year also became shareholders of Telefônica Brasil, Oi, Embratel, TIM, and others.

=== Installed telephones ===
One-million-telephone plan: As soon as it began operations, Telesp's first action was to continue the one-million-telephone plan (P1M) approved by the Ministry of Communications and started by Companhia Telefônica Brasileira in October 1971, in which 375,000 telephone terminals were intended for the capital and 175,000 intended for the interior, to be installed by 1976. Of this total, CTB had already contracted 240,000 telephone terminals, and Telesp completed in 1973 the contracting that exhausted the share of this plan allocated to the state of São Paulo; the milestone of one million telephones in service was reached in 1975. In the overall planning of this expansion, in addition to the capital, two cities of great economic importance in its service area stood out:

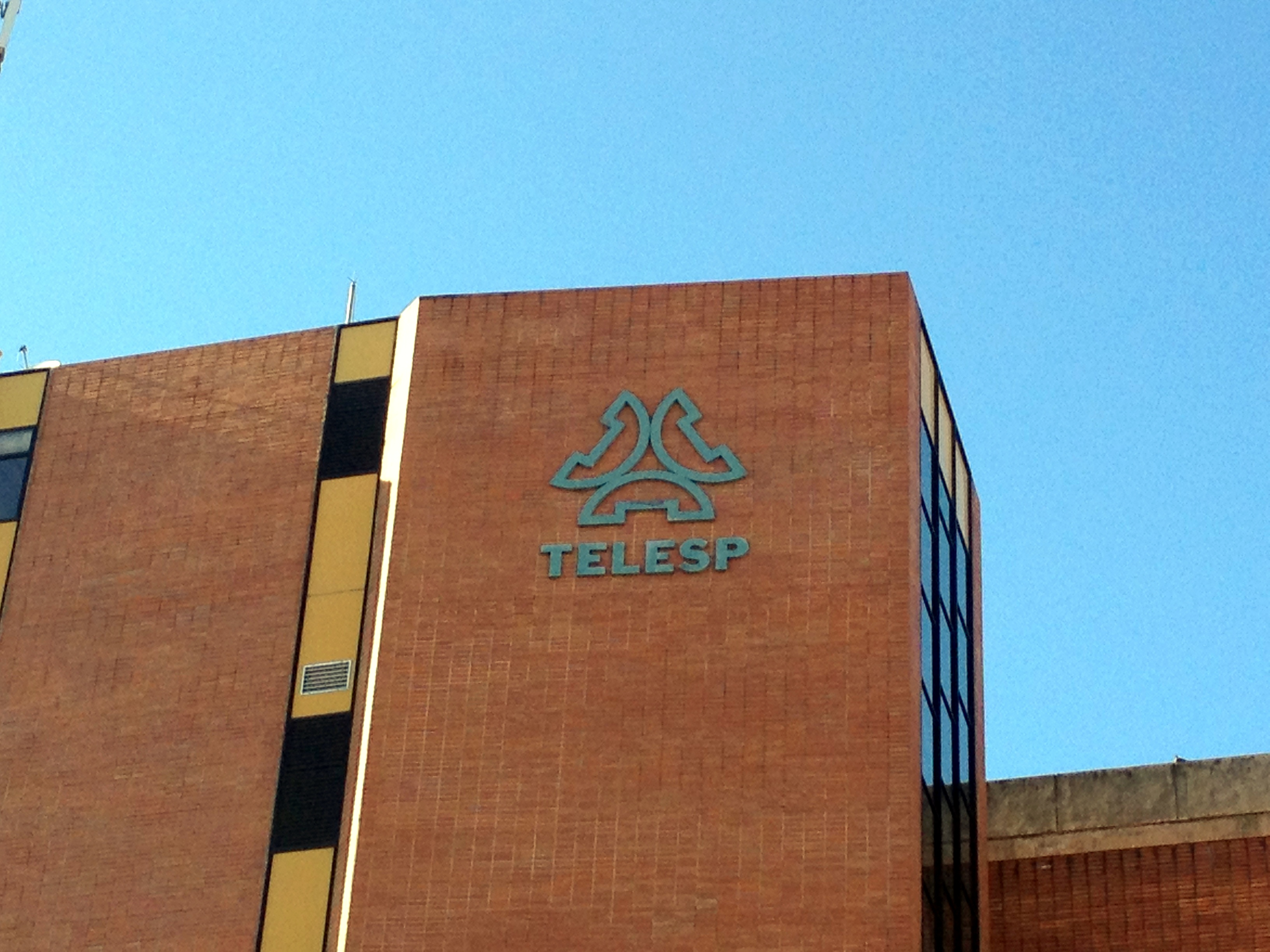
Detail of the Cambuí telephone exchange in Campinas.

• Campinas – with 28,610 terminals in 1973, a further 40,800 terminals were contracted: 10,200 for station "31" (Cidade), 10,200 for station "41" (Castelo), 5,100 for station "42" (Castelo), 10,200 for station "51" (Cambuí) and 5,100 for station "52" (Cambuí); and the 8,400 terminals of station "9" (Cidade) were replaced, which was deactivated

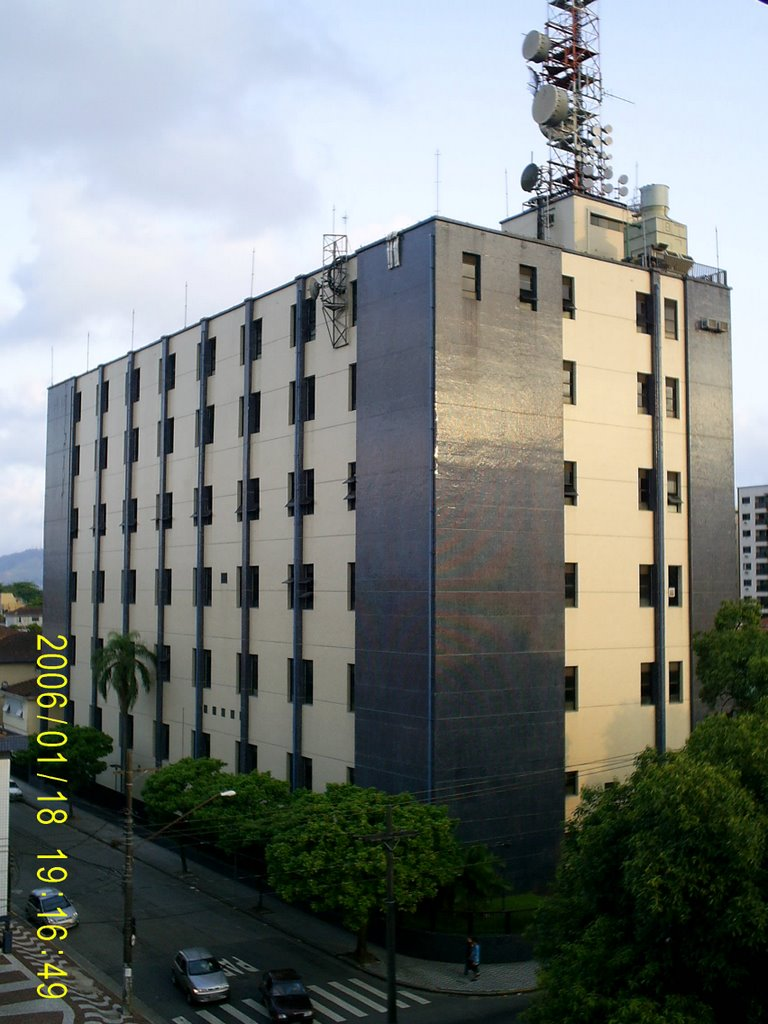
Washington Luís telephone exchange in Santos.

• Santos – with 28,400 terminals in 1973, a further 44,000 terminals were contracted, of which 10,200 for station "32" and 10,200 for station "33" (both at the Washington Luís exchange), 10,200 for station "34" and 10,200 for station "35" (also at the Washington Luís exchange), and the 8,400 terminals of station "2" (Brás Cubas) were replaced, which was deactivated From then on, Telesp established its own expansion plans. Additional plan: An emergency action initiated in July 1973 which, unlike the expansion plans, first consisted of implementing automatic telephone exchanges in localities defined as priorities by Telesp; then, shortly after the completion of the exchange-implementation works, the telephone lines were marketed and installed. Two-million-telephone plan: The high levels of development of the state's growth at the time indicated the need to begin executing new plans aimed at reaching the target set in the agreement signed in October 1973 between Telesp and COTESP through the State Telecommunications Master Plan, under which by 1980 the average number of telephones in the state should be 12 per 100 inhabitants and cities with more than 10,000 inhabitants should be interconnected to the DDD system. In this agreement, the two-million-telephone plan (P2M) was announced, made official in January 1974, with the milestone of two million telephones in service reached in 1978. Later expansions: From then on, registrations for expansion plans were opened continuously, with Telesp signing contracts every year with the main suppliers of telephone equipment. Thus, in 1982 the milestone of three million telephones in service was reached, and in 1986 the milestone of four million telephones in service was reached.

Number of telephone terminals (thousands)
Year	Increase in terminals	Terminals installed	Terminals in service	Telephones in service
1973	83.7	597.1	530.0	827.0
1974	66.5	677.0	585.0	926.6
1975	134.0	824.0	695.0	1,112.9
1976	237.8	1,085.0	902.0	1,398.8
1977	207.6	1,314.1	1,077.0	1,684.5
1978	279.5	1,593.6	1,320.0	2,012.2
1979	206.7	1,800.3	1,531.0	2,365.4
1980	69.4	1,869.7	1,702.6	2,678.1
1981	92.0	1,960.3	1,806.8	2,938.8
1982	135.0	2,095.0	1,969.9	3,221.4
1983	135.0	2,229.9	2,111.7	3,470.8
1984	184.9	2,414.8	2,284.5	3,731.8
1985	118.8	2,533.6	2,417.6	3,991.3
1986	140.3	2,673.9	2,508.7	4,196.1
1987	119.9	2,793.8	2,567.1	4,466.4
1988	125.4	2,919.2	2,695.6	4,506.2
1989	192.0	3,111.0	2,814.9	4,533.4

Community telephone plan: In November 1990, the Ministry of Infrastructure regulated the Community Telephone Program (PCT), under which Telebrás subsidiaries were authorized to transfer the task of expanding telephone networks to private companies, making them responsible for marketing and installing telephones, with a maximum period of 18 months. As a result, telephones became more widespread and more affordable. While there was an expansion of 97,900 terminals in 1990 and 241,200 terminals in 1991, when these companies began implementing the PCTs for Telesp, 334,000 terminals were installed in 1992. In 1993, 236,000 terminals were installed, and in 1994, 221,000 terminals were installed, totaling about 4.2 million telephone terminals installed and about 3.9 million in service.

Final expansions: In 1995, the number of installed telephone terminals was 4.5 million, with 4.2 million in service; in 1996, the number of installed terminals was 4.9 million, with 4.6 million in service. In 1997, the number of installed terminals reached 5.4 million, with a digitization rate of 55% of the installed base; 94% of installed terminals were in service, reaching 5 million. Of these terminals, 67% were residential (3.4 million), 20% non-residential (1 million), 10% trunks (500,000), and 3% public-use terminals (150,000). The number of terminals per 100 inhabitants (teledensity) that year was 16.64.

Main cities in Telesp's operating area (except the capital):

Number of installed terminals
City (Note: 1973–1977: cities with more than 5,000 terminals 1979–1982: cities with more than 8,000 terminals 1985–1987: cities with more than 10,000 terminals 1989: Main cities by number of installed telephone terminals, with number of installed telephone exchanges and, in parentheses, number of existing telephone centers)	Dist.	Term. 1973	Term. 1975	Term. 1977	Term. 1979	Term. 1980	Term. 1982	Term. 1985	Term. 1987	Term. 1989	Exch. 1989
Guarulhos	OL6		7140	7140	17340	17340	23440	35910	37950	40020	7 (2)
Barueri	OW6							10520	11580	11580	2 (2)
Cotia	OW6								10244	10244	2 (2)
Osasco	OW6			10200	20400	20400	20400	32840	32840	36920	5 (1)
Campinas	OA1	28610	30410	61010	76310	76310	76570	111230	113290	120430	13 (4)
Jundiaí	OA2	10500	10500	16850	16850	17850	24920	33150	35190	35290	5 (3)
Americana	OA5				10200	10200	10200	12240	13260	21416	3 (1)
Limeira	OA5			5020	11708	11708	11708	13748	15300	25500	3 (1)
Piracicaba	OA5	11500	11500	16500	21600	21600	21600	26600	27600	33740	4 (2)
Rio Claro	OA3		5100	5100	9180	9180	11180	13260	13260	13260	2 (1)
Sorocaba	OA4	9000	9040	9681	20400	21800	30400	30400	30400	34480	4 (2)
Bauru	OB1	5000	5000	12140	15200	15200	18200	18400	25640	28642	5 (2)
Presidente Prudente	OB2				8522	8522	10522	15334	15334	15334	3 (1)
Marília	OB3				8160	8160	10160	12260	14300	16340	2 (1)
Guarujá	OS1			6140	15700	16500	19500	20758	23098	25326	5 (3)
Praia Grande	OS2						9040	13740	13740	13760	4 (4)
Santos	OS1	28400	50280	66780	66780	70280	76280	100830	102230	110710	12 (5)
São Vicente	OS2				10000	10000	14000	14000	18208	18208	3 (1)
Jacareí	OS3								10200	11424	2 (1)
São José dos Campos	OS3	10200	10200	10200	24400	25400	26400	32500	35660	47020	6 (3)
Taubaté	OS4				12180	12180	16180	16180	18400	20440	3 (1)
São José do Rio Preto	OT1	5045	5061	13260	21420	21420	23420	25560	25560	25560	3 (1)
Araçatuba	OT2			8000	8000	8000	9920	12498	12498	13518	2 (1)
Araraquara	OT3	5430	8160	8160	10200	12200	12200	22400	22400	22400	3 (2)
São Carlos	OT3					12519	12767	16669	16669	21309	3 (1)

== Telephone exchanges ==
When Telesp was created, part of the state's cities did not have telephone systems. Of these, most were served only by a Service Post (PS), but some were still "silent zones", not even having a PS, which was the case for Estrela do Norte, Flora Rica, Igaratá, Palmares Paulista, Pedra Bela, Pinhalzinho, Pirapora do Bom Jesus and Sagres. There were also cases of cities whose telephone system was abandoned, such as Queiroz, cities that had their telephone system extinguished, such as Caiabu, or cities served by companies that had been halted, such as Empresa Telefônica Mogiana of Santo Antônio de Posse. The completion of the implementation of telephone systems in cities that lacked Telesp urban services occurred in 1979, with Rifaina the last city to get a telephone system; Telesp even launched the TV commercial "Rifaina", which received the award for Best Special Project at the 2nd edition of Rede Globo's Profissionais do Ano award in 1979.

=== Manual exchanges ===
Most cities that had telephone systems were served by manual exchanges with switchboards operated by telephone operators. Telesp continued to implement manual exchanges in municipal seats only until 1979, and only on an emergency basis. The last cities to have telephone systems implemented through manual exchanges were:

- Adolfo, Flora Rica, Guarani d'Oeste, Itapura, Lagoinha, Mendonça, Mirassolândia, Sagres, São João das Duas Pontes and Sebastianópolis do Sul (1975)
- Barra do Turvo, Estrela do Norte, Gabriel Monteiro, Narandiba, Palmares Paulista, Sandovalina, Santa Clara d'Oeste, Tarabai and União Paulista (1976)
- Pontes Gestal, Rubinéia and São Francisco (1977)
- Mariápolis, Marinópolis, Nova Guataporanga, Paulicéia, Pedranópolis, Pinhalzinho, Platina, Santa Mercedes, Santana da Ponte Pensa and São João do Pau d'Alho (1978)
- Pedra Bela (1979)

Because they were obsolete, manual exchanges were gradually replaced by Telesp's automatic exchanges until 1985, when the automation of telephone exchanges in all municipal seats within its coverage area was completed. However, manual exchanges continued to be installed in districts in the 1980s, including in some that became emancipated in the 1990s, such as Nova Castilho and São João de Iracema.

=== Automatic exchanges ===
==== Capital ====
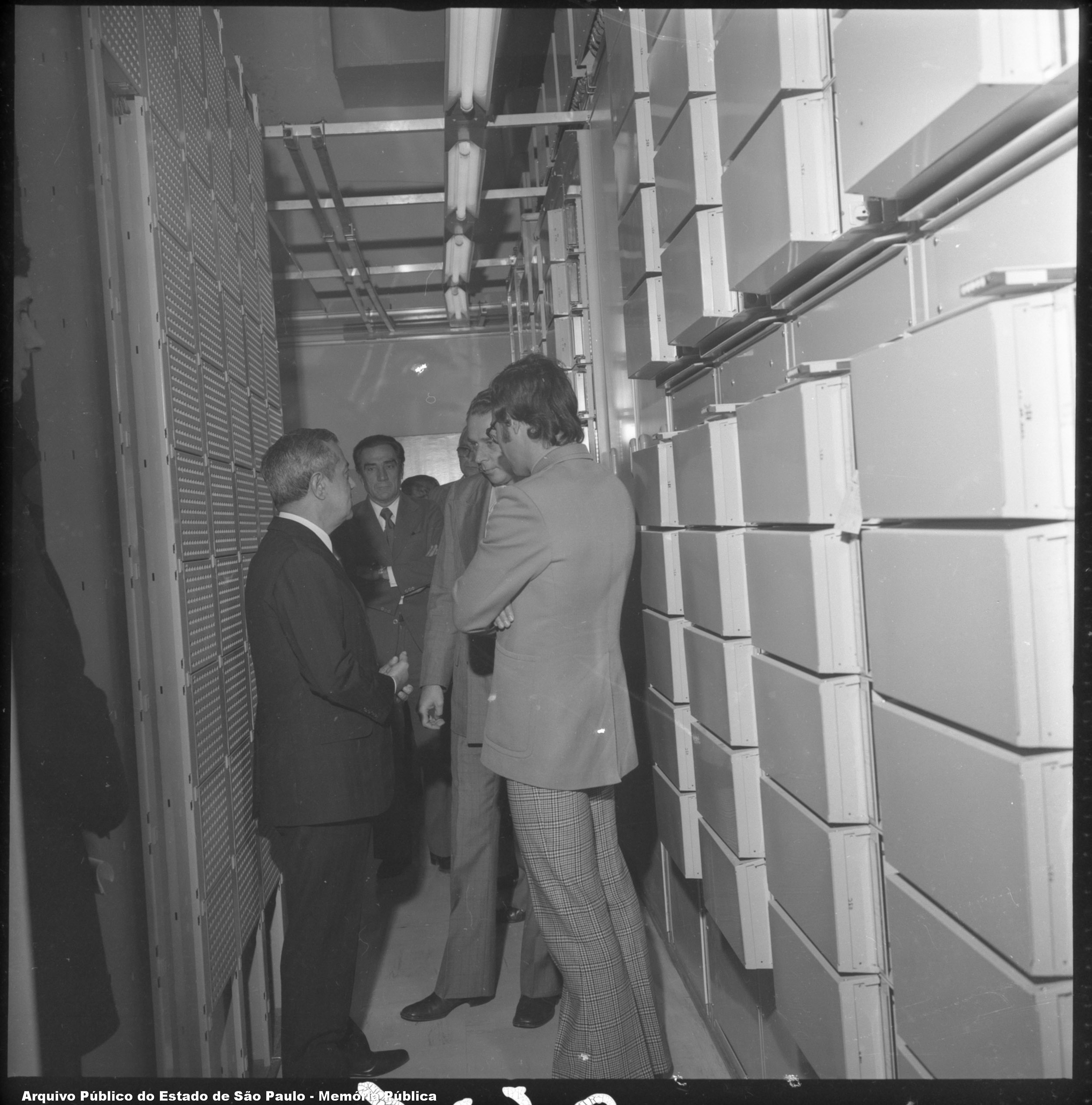
Crossbar exchange installed at the Campo Belo telephone center (1974)

In April 1973, Telecomunicações de São Paulo (TELESP) was created. The following month, CTB transferred its entire holdings in the state to this company.

When it came to being served by Telesp, the city of São Paulo had 48 automatic exchanges installed in 24 telephone exchange buildings. Soon after, the first contract was signed to expand the capital's telephone network, and Telesp had already begun a new expansion plan.

Upon taking over operations, Telesp already inaugurated the new telephone exchanges of the one million telephones plan (P1M): Campo Belo (exchange "241"), Guarani (exchange "271"), Paraíso (exchange "289"), Penha (exchange "296") and Pinheiros (exchange "210").

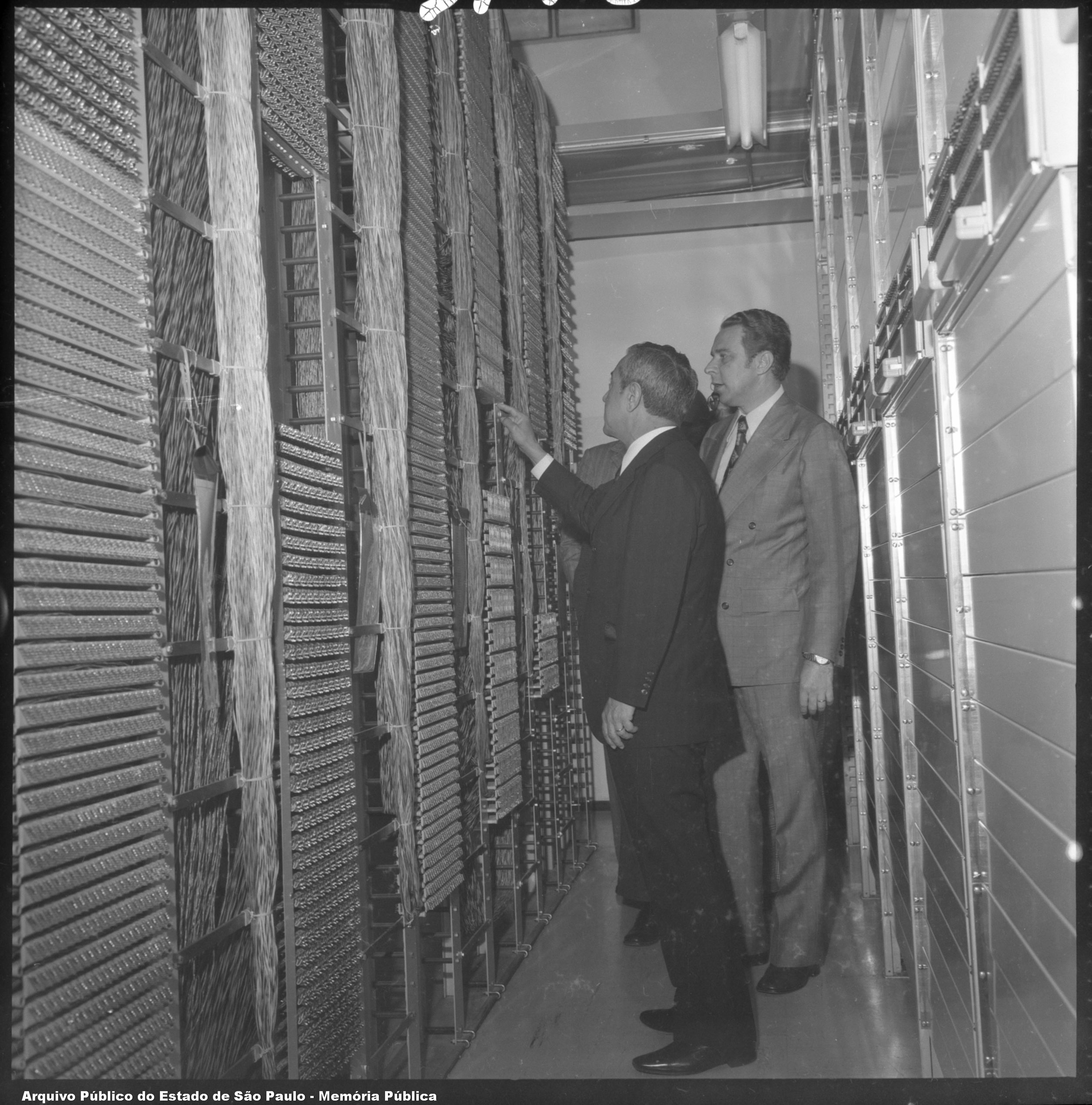
Crossbar exchange installed in the Campo Belo telephone exchange building (1974).

Telesp continued, without interruption, the ongoing works begun by CTB: the telephone exchange building Guarani (inaugurated in 1973) and the planned telephone exchange buildings Jaguaré, Tremembé and Vila Gustavo (inaugurated between 1977 and 1978).

The city of Guarulhos was integrated into the São Paulo area in 1974, and therefore its telephone exchanges began to follow the capital's numbering sequence. However, the DDD system was installed in the city only in 1975, after the completion of the works on the new telephone exchange.

During this period, Telesp conducted an area cutover at the Benjamin Constant center and deactivated exchange "33" to improve telephone traffic in this critical area of the capital. Another area with many problems that were resolved was the Jardins center, where exchanges "80" and "81" were replaced by exchanges "852" and "853" respectively; exchange "81" was switched off and dismantled, and exchange "80" was reused and reactivated in 1977 as exchange "64".

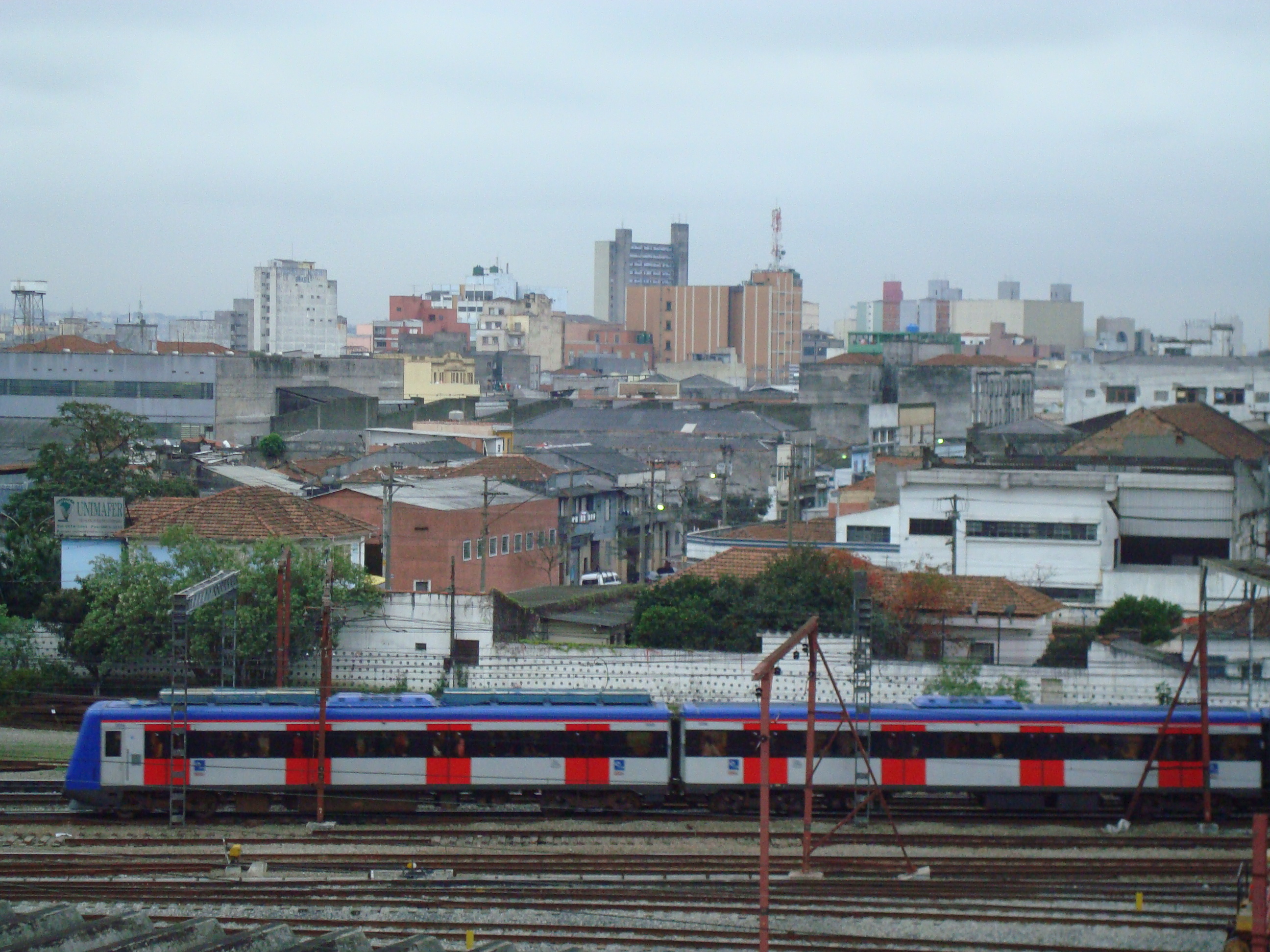
In the background, the 2nd building of the Brás telephone exchange building.

Through its own planning, it inaugurated new telephone exchange buildings, the first being Parelheiros (inaugurated in 1978) and Ceagesp (inaugurated in 1981), It also expanded the buildings of the telephone exchange buildings inaugurated by CTB between 1968 and 1970, and built annex buildings to older telephone exchange buildings (Benjamin Constant, Brás, Campo Belo, Guarulhos, Ipiranga, Jardins, Palmeiras, Perdizes and Vila Mariana), always using crossbar exchanges as equipment.

In 1979, the city of Osasco was integrated into the São Paulo area. The new telephone exchange building was inaugurated in 1977 (exchange "478"), and was changed to exchange "801" when the integration occurred, at the same time that the second telephone exchange (exchange "802") was inaugurated, thereafter following the capital's numbering sequence until 1986, when there was a new change in prefixes.

===== CPA exchanges =====
In December 1977, the country's first digital telephone exchange was inaugurated on an experimental basis (the so-called CPA – centrais controladas por programa armazenado). PRX-series equipment (Philips) was used, and the exchange was installed in Vila Mariana (prefix "544").

But it was another digital technology, the AXE-10 series (Ericsson), that was deployed definitively, with the first exchange also inaugurated in Vila Mariana (prefix "572") in April 1982, gradually beginning the deployment of digital exchanges in São Paulo.

In the same year, two more CPAs were inaugurated: in the Guarani telephone exchange building (prefix "918") in September 1982, and Lapa (prefix "832") in December 1982, and the following year six more CPAs were inaugurated, in the Jabaquara telephone exchange building (prefix "579") in March 1983, Ipiranga (prefix "914") in May 1983, Casa Verde (prefix "858") and Penha (prefix "941") in November 1983, Campo Belo (prefix "533") and Osasco (prefix "803") in December 1983.

In 1984 the telephone exchange buildings Americanópolis, Campo Limpo, Cumbica, Ibirapuera, Jaraguá, Morumbi, São Mateus and Vila Esperança were inaugurated with only digital exchanges. By that year, 26 CPAs with around 200,000 terminals had already been installed in the capital area.

In the following years, the telephone exchange buildings Anhanguera and Nova Parelheiros (1985), Freguesia do Ó (1986), Anchieta, Guarapiranga and Vila Prudente (1987), Dutra (1988), Cidade Vargas and Itaim Bibi (1989) were inaugurated.

The "áreas mudas" in the municipality persisted for some years after Telecomunicações de São Paulo (TELESP) took over operations. Parelheiros only began to have telephone service in 1978 (1,000 terminals with the 9 thousand-group of prefix "246", changed to "520" in 1979), Jaraguá in 1984 (4,000 digital terminals with prefix "841") and Nova Parelheiros in 1985 (1,000 terminals with the 8 thousand-group of prefix "520").

By the end of the 1980s, there were 45 telephone exchange buildings installed in the city of São Paulo:

Telephone exchange building	Telephone exchange			
Telephone exchange building	CTB (step-by-step)	CTB (crossbar)	Telesp (crossbar)	Telesp (digital exchanges)
Americanópolis				562 (1984); 565 (1986); 563 (1989)
Anchieta				946 (1987); 947 (1987)
Anhangabaú		227 (1969); 228 (1970)	229 (1976); 230 (1980)	
Anhanguera				834 (1985)
Benjamin Constant (1º prédio)	32 (1929); 34 (1939); 36 (1946); 35 (1951); 37 (1953)	239 (1967)		
Brás (1º prédio)	93 (1944); 92 (1961)	292 (1970)		
Brás (2º prédio)			291 (1976); 264 (1978); 948 (1983)	
Campo Belo (1º prédio)	61 (1953)	240 (1967); 241 (1973) (Note: Installed by CTB but activated by Telesp)		
Campo Belo (2º prédio)			543 (1975); 542 (1976); 531 (1978); 532 (1979)	533 (1983); 530 (1985); 535 (1987)
Campo Limpo				511 (1984); 512 (1987)
Casa Verde		266 (1969)	265 (1976); 857 (1979)	858 (1983); 856 (1987)
Ceagesp (deactivated)			859 (1981)	
Cidade Vargas				588 (1989)
Consolação		256 (1969); 257 (1970)	258 (1975); 259 (1976); 231 (1978); 255 (1979); 234 (1980); 235 (1980)	
Dutra				967 (1988)
Ermelino Matarazzo		206 (1970)		943 (1984)
Freguesia do Ó				875 (1986); 876 (1988)
Guaianases		207 (1970)		
Guarani		271 (1973)	216 (1978)	918 (1982); 910 (1984)
Guarapiranga				514 (1987)
GRU – Guarulhos (2º prédio)			209 (1974); 208 (1979); 913 (1982)	940 (1984); 964 (1987)
GRU – Cumbica				912 (1984); 945 (1985)
Ibirapuera				884 (1984); 885 (1986); 887 (1986)
Ipiranga (1º prédio)	63 (1955)	273 (1969); 274 (1969)		
Ipiranga (2º prédio)			272 (1976); 215 (1978)	914 (1983)
Itaim Bibi				820 (1989); 829 (1989)
Itaquera		205 (1970)		944 (1984)
Jabaquara		275 (1968); 276 (1969)	577 (1976); 578 (1979)	579 (1983); 581 (1986)
Jaguaré			268 (1977); 869 (1978)	819 (1988)
Jaraguá				841 (1984)
Jardins (1º prédio)	64 (1977) (Note: Former exchange "80", deactivated in 1976 and reactivated in 1977 as exchange "64")	282 (1967)		
Jardins (2º prédio)			280 (1976); 852 (1976) (Note: Exchanges "852" and "853" replaced exchanges "80" and "81"); 853 (1976); 881 (1976); 883 (1980)	
Lapa		260 (1968)	261 (1975); 831 (1978)	832 (1982); 833 (1988)
Liberdade		278 (1969); 279 (1970)	270 (1976); 254 (1983)	277 (1984)
Morumbi			843 (1984)	842 (1986); 844 (1986)
Nova Parelheiros			520-8 (1985)	
OSS – Osasco (2º prédio)			701 (1977); 702 (1979)	703 (1983); 704 (1985); 705 (1988)
Palmeiras (1º prédio)	66 (1928); 67 (1948)			
Palmeiras (2º prédio)			825 (1975); 826 (1976)	
Paraíso		287 (1969); 288 (1969); 289 (1973)	285 (1975); 284 (1976); 283 (1979); 251 (1980); 252 (1980); 286 (1980)	
Parelheiros			520-1 (1978)	
Penha		295 (1968); 296 (1973)	294 (1976); 293 (1978); 217 (1979)	941 (1983)
Perdizes (1º prédio)	62 (1956); 65 (1960)	262 (1967)		
Perdizes (2º prédio)			263 (1975); 864 (1978)	872 (1984); 874 (1986); 871 (1988)
Pinheiros		211 (1969); 210 (1973)	212 (1976); 813 (1978); 814 (1979); 815 (1979)	
Santa Ifigênia		220 (1968); 221 (1969)	222 (1976); 223 (1976)	
Santana		298 (1968); 299 (1969)	290 (1976); 267 (1978)	950 (1984); 959 (1987)
Santo Amaro		247 (1969); 246 (1973)	548 (1976); 521 (1978); 522 (1979); 523 (1979); 545 (1979)	524 (1984)
São Mateus				919 (1984); 962 (1987)
São Miguel Paulista		297 (1970)		956 (1987)
Tremembé			203 (1977); 204 (1979)	952 (1988)
Vila Esperança				957 (1984); 958 (1986)
Vila Gustavo			201 (1978); 202 (1979)	949 (1984); 951 (1988)
Vila Mariana (1º prédio)	570 (1951); 571 (1951)			
Vila Mariana (2º prédio)			549 (1976)	544 (1977); 572 (1982); 575 (1984); 574 (1989)
Vila Prudente				965 (1987); 966 (1989)

==== Interior ====
Medium- and large-scale exchanges:

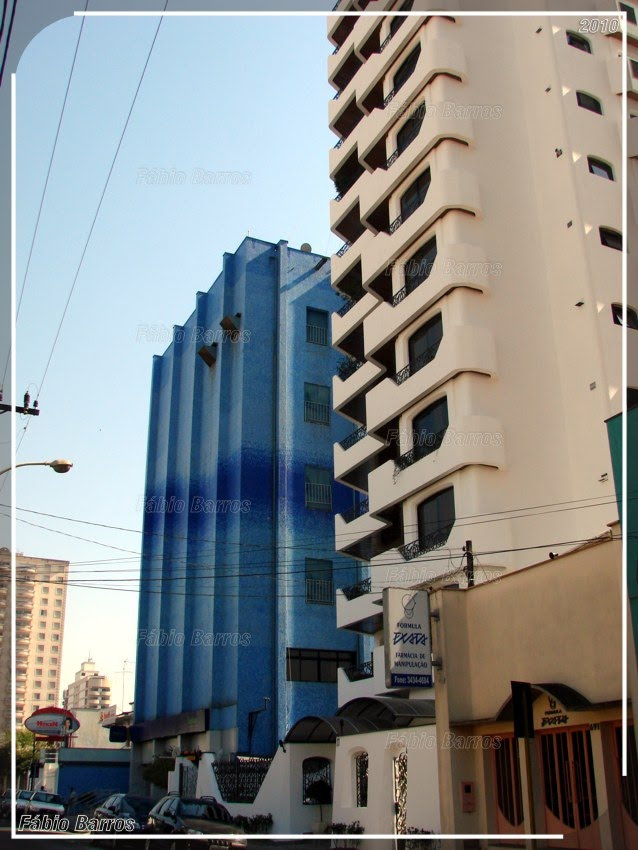
Telephone exchange in Piracicaba.

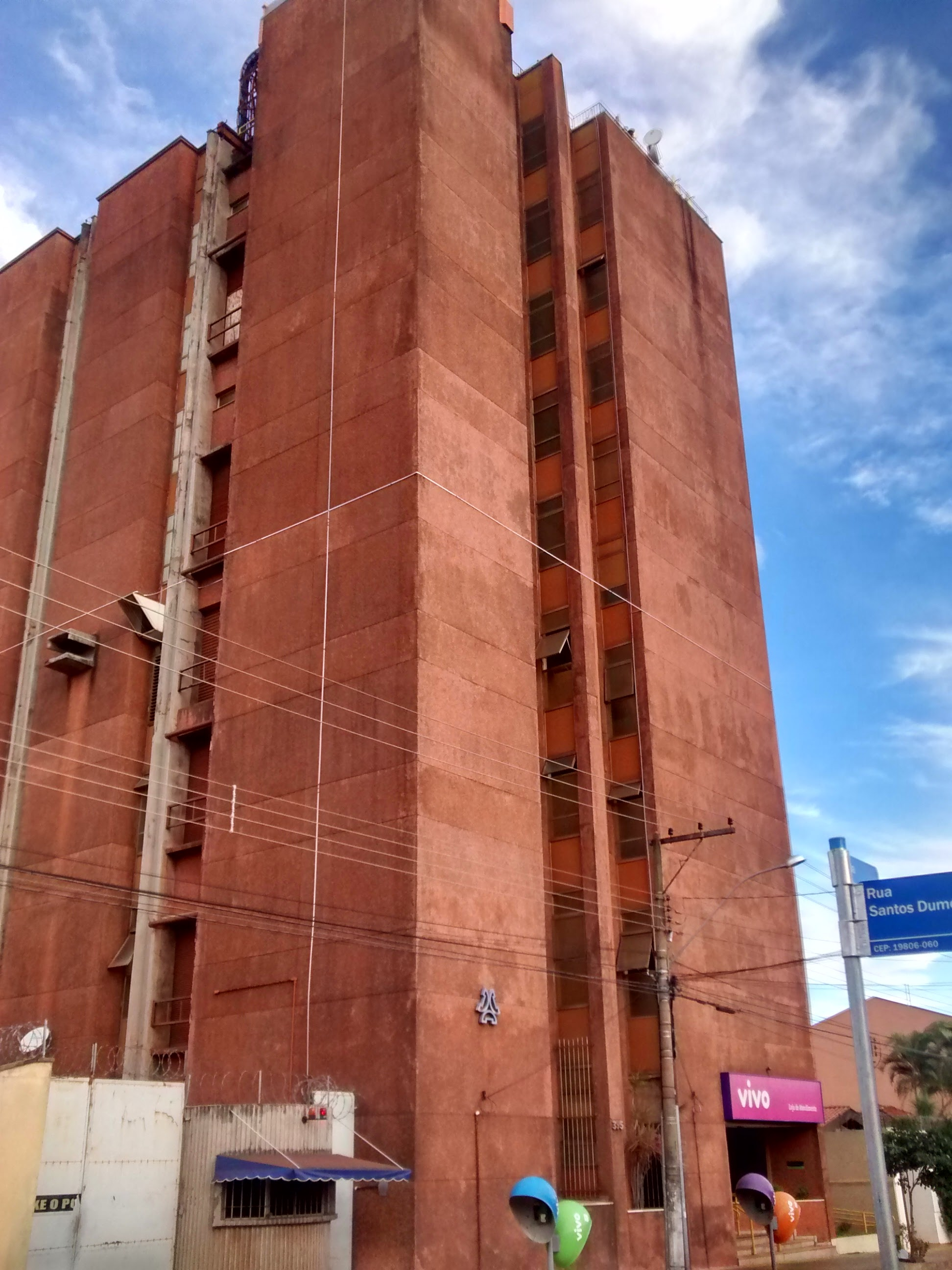
Telephone exchange in Assis.

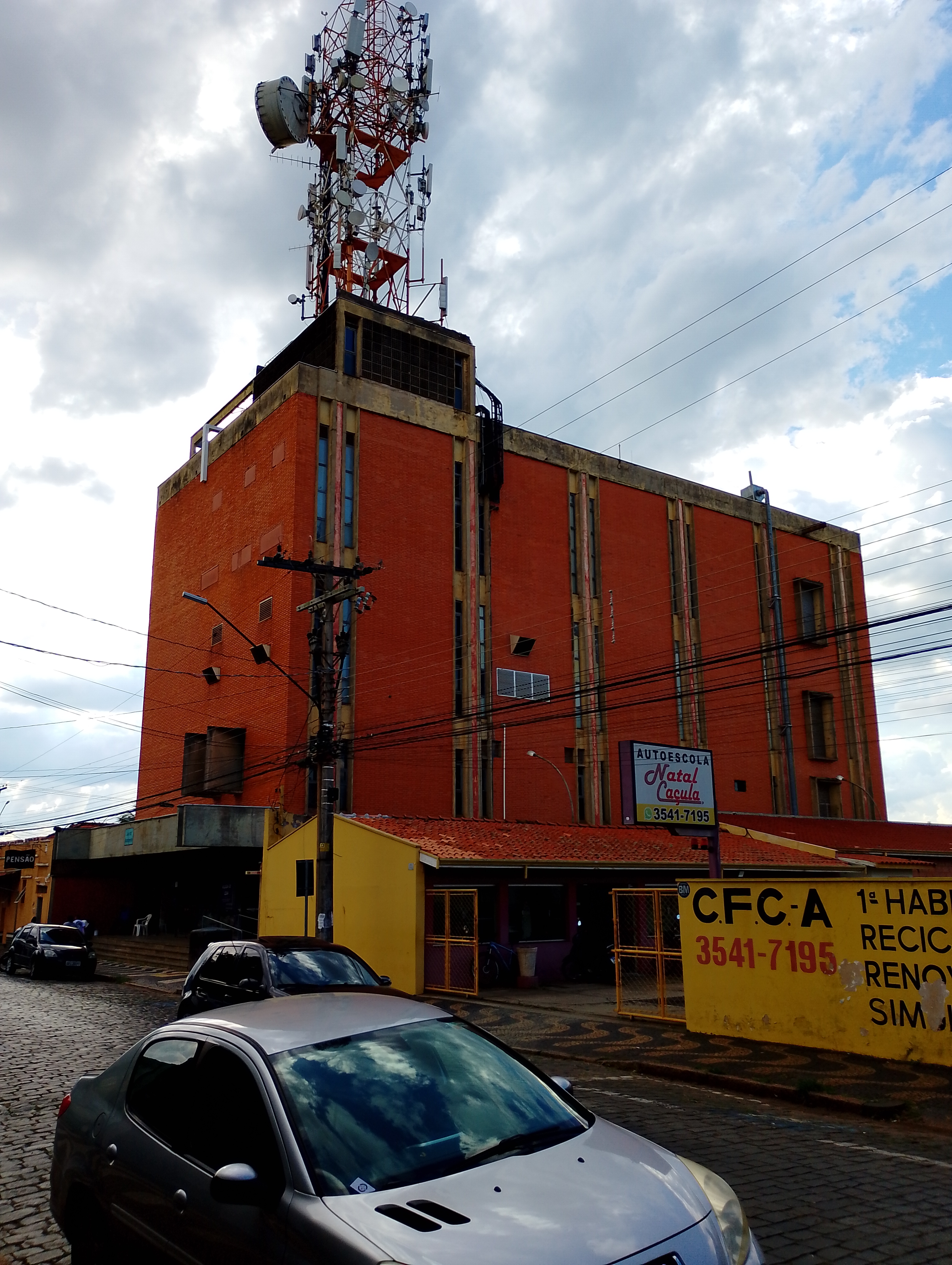
Telephone exchange in Araras.

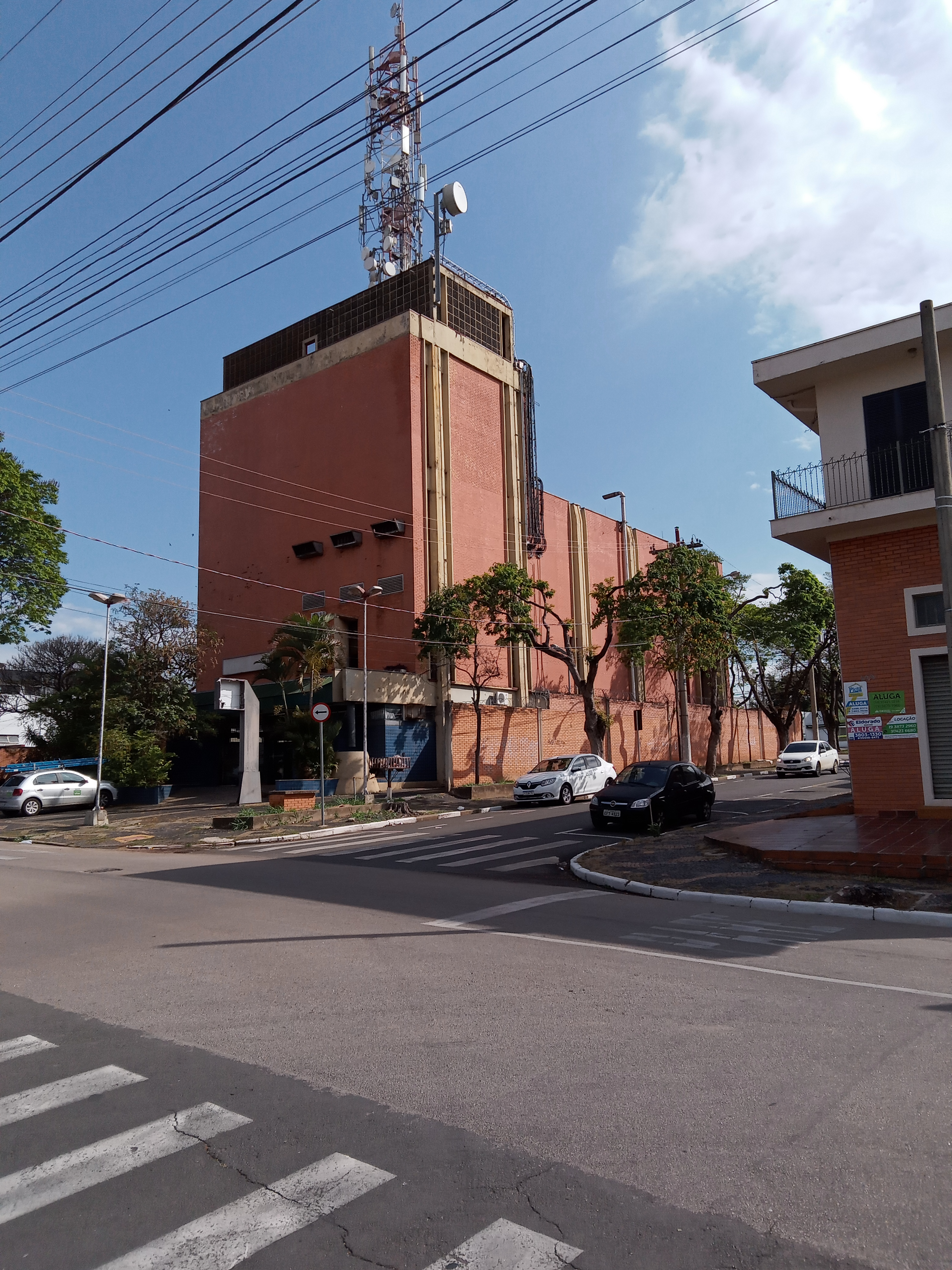
Telephone exchange in Sumaré.

In interior cities that already had automatic exchanges, they were step-by-step, rotary, and crossbar types, from various manufacturers (Automatic Electric, Ericsson, Standard Elétrica and Plessey). As the need to expand terminals arose, step-by-step and rotary exchanges were replaced by crossbar exchanges. In cities that already had crossbar exchanges, the number of terminals could be increased without changing the equipment. Of the oldest automatic exchanges installed by CTB, only a few were kept, such as Araraquara, Bauru, Campinas, Rio Claro and Santos (Brás Cubas and Tocantins), as well as some exchanges in networks administered by CTB such as Jundiaí, Piracicaba, São João da Boa Vista and Votuporanga. The automatic exchanges inaugurated by CTB between 1970 and 1972, and that were part of the first expansion plan, were kept, some of which had their buildings expanded or replaced:

- Avaré (replaced), Barra Bonita, Botucatu, Bragança Paulista, Cruzeiro, Garça, Itapetininga (replaced), Itapeva, Itapira, Itatiba, Itu, Jaboticabal, Lençóis Paulista, Mococa, Mogi Guaçu (replaced), Mogi Mirim (expanded), Penápolis, Piedade, Promissão, Santos–Washington Luís and Tatuí

As for the other automatic exchanges installed by CTB and its administered networks, they were replaced by larger buildings and new equipment, such as the exchanges in Assis, Araçatuba, Guaratinguetá, Guarujá, Guarulhos, Jacareí, Marília, Presidente Prudente, São José do Rio Preto, São José dos Campos and Sorocaba.

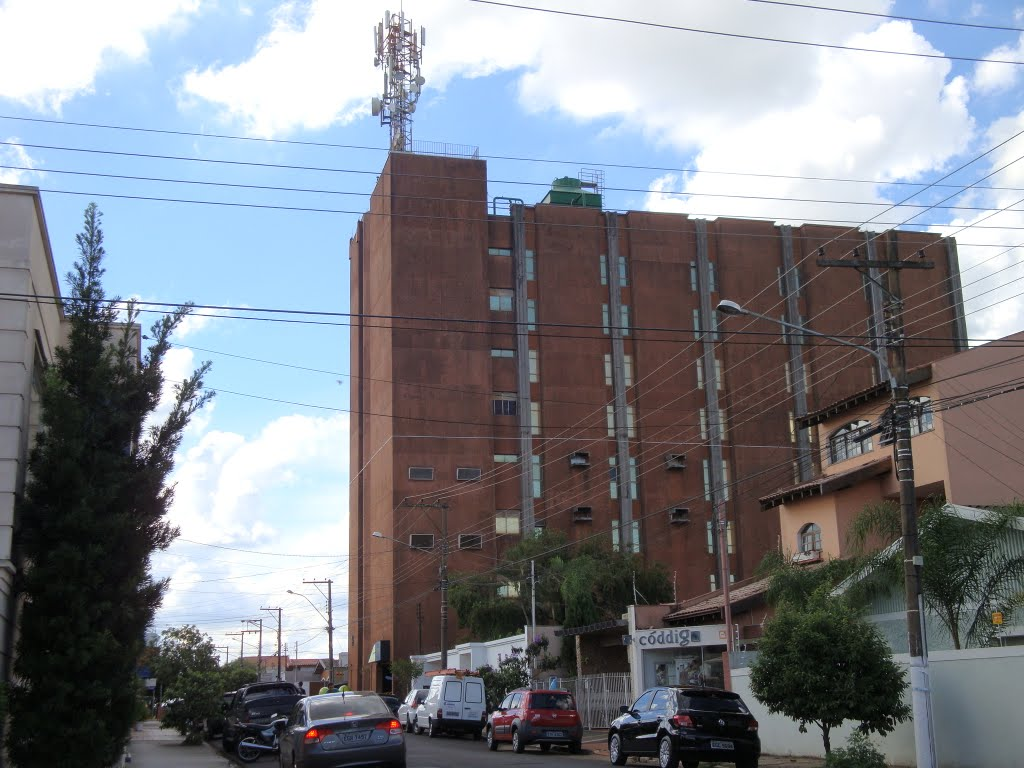
Telephone exchange in Assis.

Of the automatic exchanges installed by COTESP, some were also kept, such as Ilhabela, Ilha Solteira, Paraibuna, Santa Branca, São Sebastião and Ubatuba. In an agreement signed in 1973, for COTESP fell the portion relating to building construction, power supply, engineering, and supervision of new telephone exchanges, which were installed in special buildings of brutalist architecture, of which the architect Ruy Ohtake, one of the most highly regarded in Brazil, produced two designs (Campos do Jordão and Ibiúna), while Telesp took charge of installing and activating the telephone equipment.

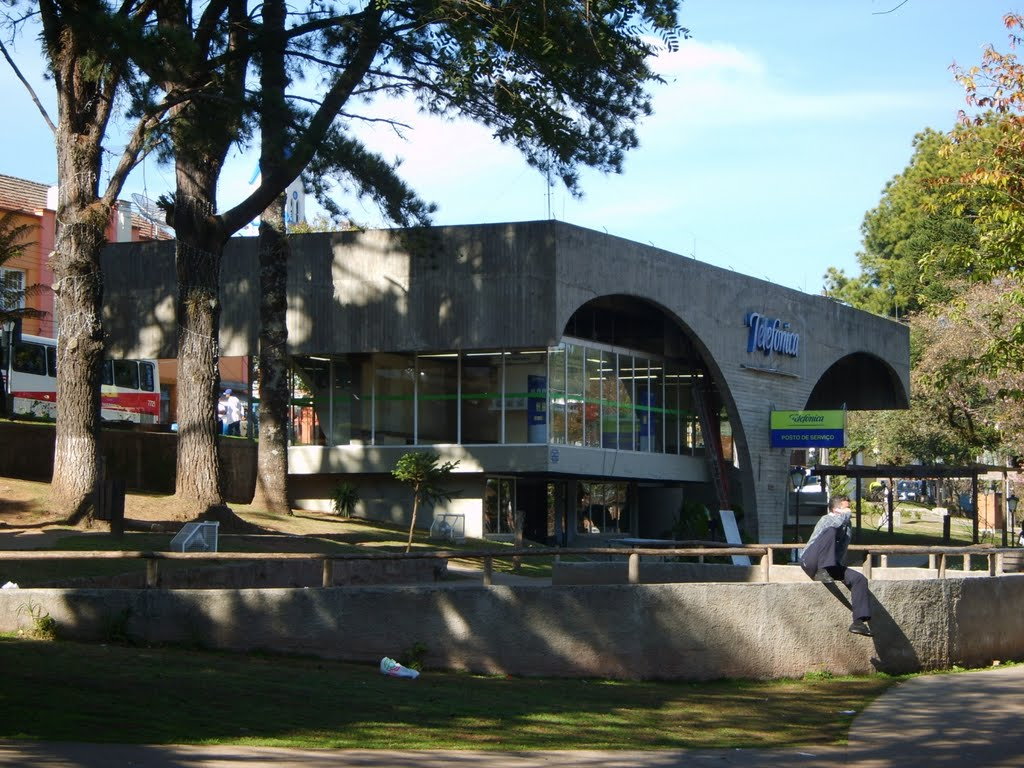
Telephone exchange in Campos do Jordão, designed by Ruy Ohtake and Júlio Katinsky.

Thus the exchanges in Andradina, Caçapava and Campos do Jordão were activated by COTESP, and the others by Telesp, with the exchanges in Angatuba, Auriflama, Capão Bonito, Itararé, Nhandeara, Pereira Barreto, Peruíbe and Registro replacing provisional automatic exchanges installed by COTESP, and the exchanges in Cachoeira Paulista, Caraguatatuba, Cardoso, Ibiúna and Piquete replacing manual exchanges. The automatic exchanges received by Telesp from the private companies that were incorporated were, for the most part, replaced by larger buildings, receiving new automatic equipment, such as the exchanges of Americana, Araras, Catanduva, Cotia, Cubatão, Granja Viana, Limeira, Osasco, Ourinhos, Praia Grande, Santa Bárbara d'Oeste, São Carlos (inaugurated in January 1980 already with the DDD system by Governor Paulo Maluf, with the inauguration act being a direct call to President Figueiredo in Brasília), São Vicente and Sumaré. Only the buildings that allowed expansion of telephone equipment were retained.

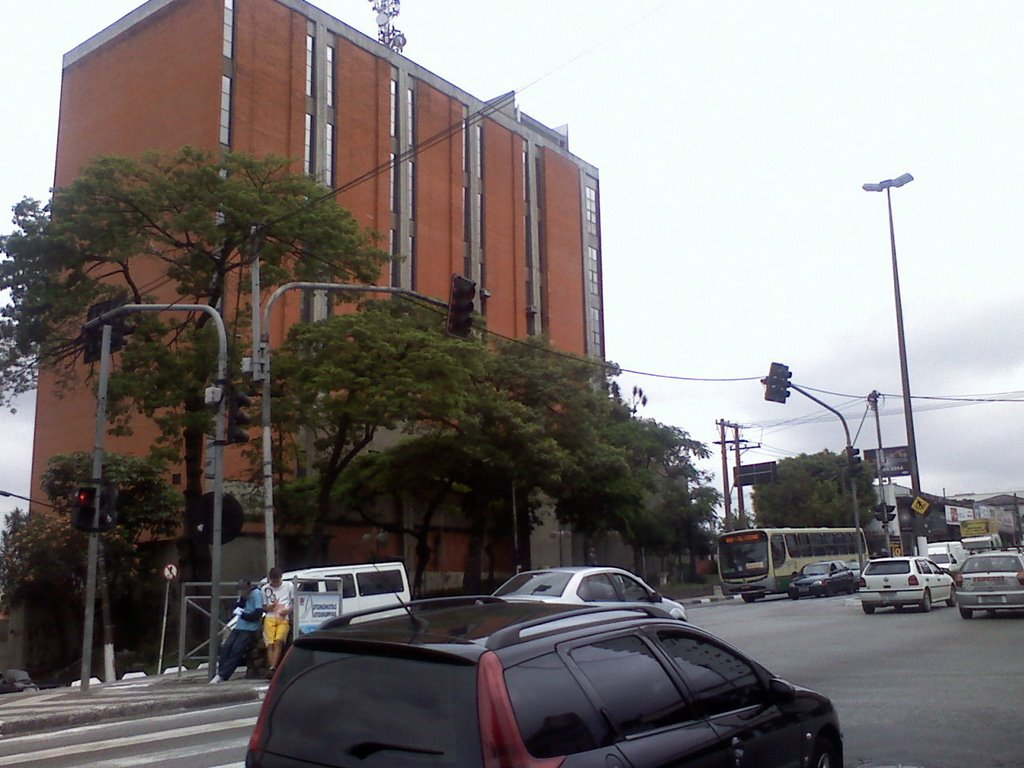
Telephone exchange in Osasco.

The first automatic exchanges inaugurated by Telesp were those that were part of the first expansion plan and also of CTB's one-million-telephone plan, and which had been planned by that company: Amparo, Indaiatuba, Paulínia, Ibitinga, Matão, Taquaritinga and Lorena (May 1973), Salto, São Roque and Sertãozinho (July 1973), Porto Feliz and São Manuel (August 1973), Laranjal Paulista and Birigui (October 1973), Poá and Carapicuíba (1973).

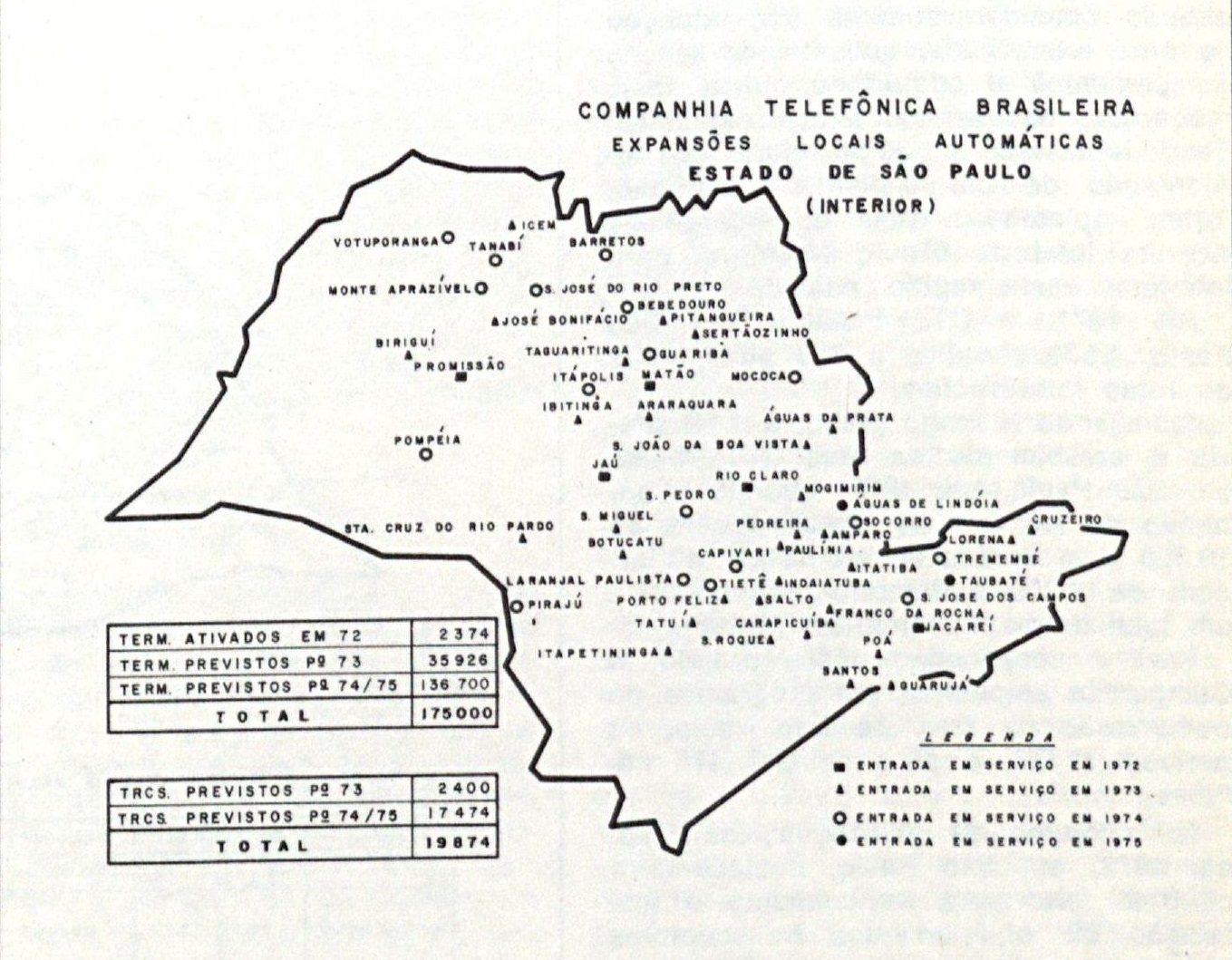
Automatic local expansions.

The others planned by CTB were inaugurated together with the new exchanges planned by Telesp, in which various types of standard buildings were used, including the PTC-1, of only a single floor:

- Pirajuí (January 1974), Barretos and Franco da Rocha (March 1974), Monte Aprazível, Teodoro Sampaio and Tremembé (September 1974), José Bonifácio and Tanabi (November 1974), Ferraz de Vasconcelos and Itaquaquecetuba (1974)
- Caieiras, Cosmópolis, Guariba and Tietê (1975)
- Capivari, Fernandópolis, Mairiporã, Quiririm and Sousas (1976)
- Adamantina, Águas de Lindóia, Agudos, Bebedouro, Bernardino de Campos, Cafelândia, Campo Limpo Paulista, Cerquilho, Dois Córregos, Duartina, Fartura, Itapevi, Jandira, Olímpia, Pederneiras, Piraju, Pirapozinho, Presidente Venceslau, Rancharia and Vera Cruz (1977)
- Barão Geraldo, Bariri, Cândido Mota, Cravinhos, Francisco Morato, Guararapes, Itapecerica da Serra, Itápolis, Junqueirópolis, Mairinque, Nova Odessa, Novo Horizonte, Palmital, Paraguaçu Paulista, Pedreira, Presidente Epitácio, Santa Cruz do Rio Pardo, Santa Rosa de Viterbo, São Pedro, Socorro and Taquarituba (1978)
- Bertioga, Lucélia, Mongaguá, Monte Azul Paulista and Tupi Paulista (1979)
- Alphaville, Bastos, Embu-Guaçu, Jaguariúna and Parque Petrópolis (1980)

The main types of crossbar exchanges deployed were: ARF-102 (Ericsson), ESK-10000 (Siemens), NC-400 (NEC), PC-1000 (Standard Elétrica) and 5005 (Plessey). In 1983, the first CPA outside the capital is inaugurated, in Osasco (prefix "803"). CPAs began to replace crossbar exchanges. However, some cities retained the obsolete step-by-step exchanges until CPAs replaced them. The main types of digital exchanges deployed were: AXE-10 (Ericsson), EWSD (Equitel / Siemens), NEAX-61 (NEC), 5ESS (AT&T) and TRÓPICO-RA (Promon – current Trópico).

Small exchanges

Before being incorporated, COTESP deployed small automatic exchanges in 1974 in cities that had not yet been transferred to Telesp. They were decadic exchanges of the UD type (Philips-Inbelsa), installed in a prefabricated standard modular-construction building, whose main characteristics were low cost and ease of short-term installation, providing a quick solution to communication problems in areas of low population density:

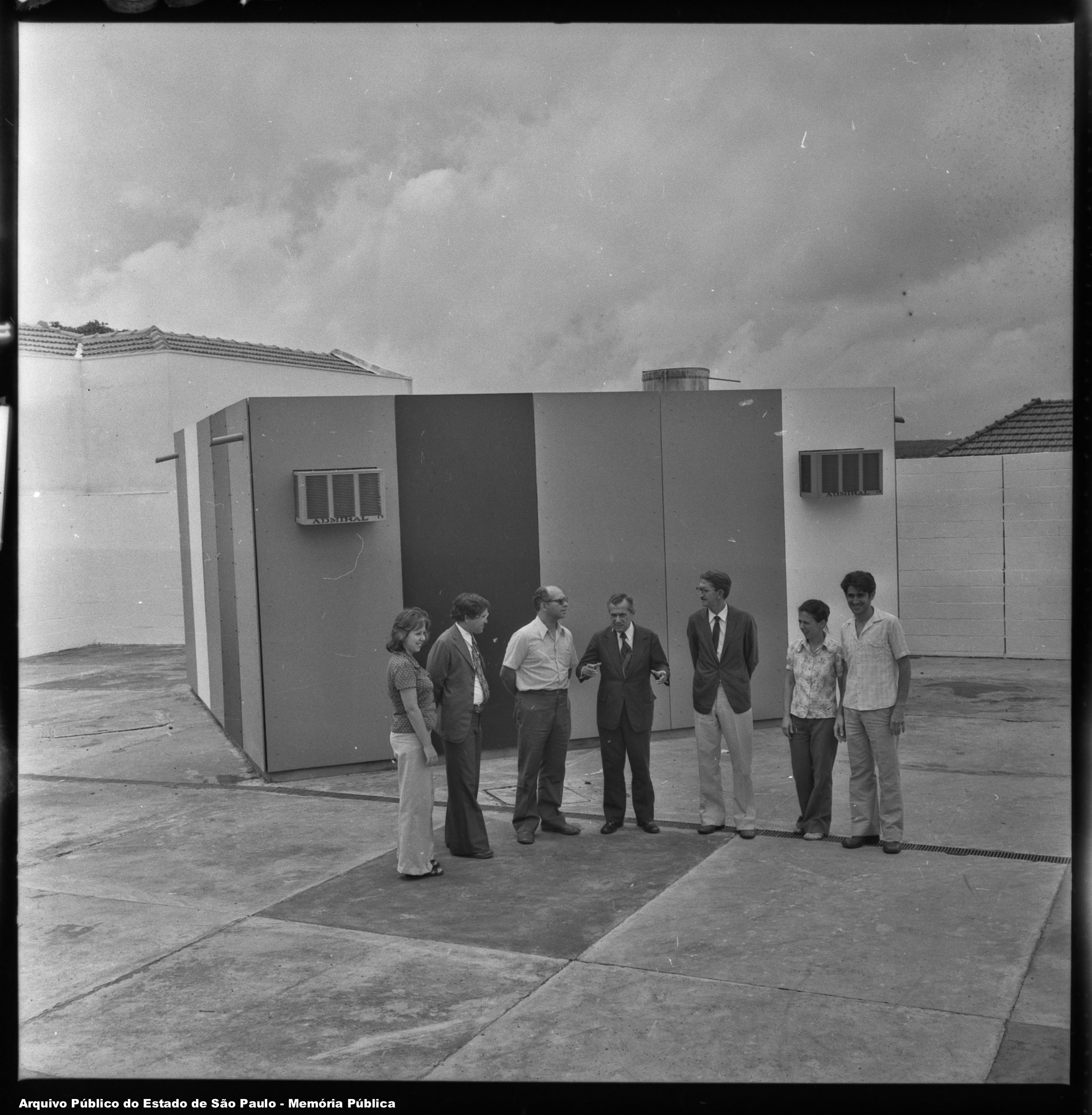
Inauguration of the telephone exchange in Getulina by COTESP (1974).

- Cananéia, Clementina, Eldorado, Estrela d'Oeste, Gastão Vidigal, General Salgado, Getulina, Indiaporã, Iporanga, Itariri, Juquitiba, Macaubal, Meridiano, Miracatu, Pedro de Toledo, Populina, Ribeira, Salto de Pirapora, Santa Rita d'Oeste and Sud Mennucci

The deployment of small automatic exchanges in the cities included in the additional plan is considered Telesp's first achievement. Most were installed in a standard PLAD-type building, characterized by a very simple masonry structure. At the same time, the exchanges of cities that were already part of CTB's expansion plan began to be deployed.

The first inaugurated were: Américo Brasiliense (July 1973), Águas da Prata, Cerqueira César, Corumbataí, Icém, Itobi, Ribeirão Bonito, Rincão and Santa Gertrudes (October 1973), Cândido Rodrigues, Dobrada, Palestina and Santa Lúcia (January 1974).

They were deployed through 1977:

- Ajapi, Analândia, Bom Jesus dos Perdões, Canas, Herculândia, Itapuí, Maracaí, Nazaré Paulista, Oriente, Quintana, Roseira, Santana de Parnaíba, Severínia and Várzea Paulista (March 1974)
- Avaí, Cajobi, Charqueada, Fernando Prestes, Guaraçaí, Guaraci, Ibirá, Itirapina, Neves Paulista, Potirendaba, Pradópolis, Serra Azul, Serrana, Silveiras and Tabapuã (September 1974)
- Altair, Avanhandava, Cabrália Paulista, Cedral and Lavrinhas (November 1974)
- Barrinha, Cesário Lange, Pereiras, Santa Maria da Serra and São José da Bela Vista (1974)
- Areias, Cabreúva, Guaíçara, Guararema, Ibaté, Jaborandi, Jarinu, Manduri, Maristela, Mineiros do Tietê, Monte Alegre do Sul, Oscar Bressane, Pitangueiras, São José do Barreiro, São Simão and Torrinha (1975)
- Alfredo Marcondes, Boituva, Elias Fausto, Ipeúna, Jeriquara, Joanópolis, Pardinho, Rafard, Santo Expedito, Taiúva, Terra Roxa and Uchôa (1976)
- Iperó, João Ramalho, Jordanésia, Lindóia, Morungaba, Pirapora do Bom Jesus, Queiroz and Redenção da Serra (1977)

Also between 1976 and 1977, UDK-type automatic exchanges (Philips-Inbelsa) were deployed, most installed in a prefabricated standard modular-construction building:

- Águas de Santa Bárbara, Campos Novos Paulista and Monte Castelo (1976)
- Alvinlândia, Américo de Campos, Apiaí, Aparecida d'Oeste, Barão de Antonina, Biritiba Mirim, Bofete, Braúna, Caiabu, Capela do Alto, Colina, Coronel Macedo, Cosmorama, Cunha, Floreal, Guareí, Guzolândia, Iacanga, Igaratá, Iguape, Itaberá, Itaí, Jaci, Jambeiro, Júlio Mesquita, Macatuba, Macedônia, Mombuca, Monteiro Lobato, Murutinga do Sul, Natividade da Serra, Panorama, Paranapuã, Poloni, Pongaí, Reginópolis, Ribeirão Branco, Riversul, Sabino, Salmourão, Santo Antônio do Pinhal, São Bento do Sapucaí, São Lourenço da Serra, São Pedro do Turvo, Sarapuí and Tapiraí (1977)
- Dolcinópolis, Guaimbê, Lupércio, Magda, Mira Estrela, Ouro Verde and Timburi (1977)

Between 1978 and 1984, the small exchanges deployed were installed in a new type of standard building, with a masonry structure:

- Águas de São Pedro, Araçoiaba da Serra, Artur Nogueira, Buritama, Ipaussu, Pontal, Porangaba, Queluz, Santo Antônio de Posse and Valparaíso (1978)
- Anhumas, Ariranha, Bady Bassitt, Bálsamo, Bilac, Bocaina, Brotas, Conchal, Dumont, Florínea, Guapiaçu, Guarani d'Oeste, Hortolândia, Ibirarema, Igarapava, Itajobi, Itatinga, Itirapuã, Juquiá, Luís Antônio, Lutécia, Marabá Paulista, Nova Europa, Nova Veneza, Palmeira d'Oeste, Patrocínio Paulista, Pedregulho, Pirangi, Rifaina, Santa Adélia, Tabatinga, Taciba, Taguaí, Valentim Gentil and Viradouro (1979)
- Cajati, Campos de Mairiporã, Conchas, Jacupiranga, Jardim Cinco Lagos, Pacaembu, Parque Suísso, Pedro Barros and Terra Preta (1980)
- Borborema, Cordeirópolis, Ilha Comprida, Paraíso, Paranapanema, Pindorama and Santo Antônio do Jardim (1980)
- Álvares Machado, Areiópolis, Barbosa, Castilho, Chavantes, Coroados, Cristais Paulista, Echaporã, Gália, Glicério, Guarantã, Iacri, Irapuã, Irapuru, Massaguaçu, Nova Aliança, Parapuã, Pedra Bela, Pilar do Sul, Piratininga, Porto Cubatão, Quatá, Regente Feijó, Rinópolis, Rosana, Samaritá, Santa Albertina, Urânia and Urupês (1981)
- Álvares Florence, Anhembi, Boa Esperança do Sul, Dourado, Indiana, Itupeva, Mendonça, Nova Granada, Orindiúva, Paulo de Faria, Piracaia, Santa Cruz da Conceição, Santa Ernestina and São Sebastião da Grama (1981)
- Bento de Abreu, Cruzália, Euclides da Cunha, Flórida Paulista, Gavião Peixoto, Ibitiúva, Inúbia Paulista, Itaporanga, Lagoinha, Lavínia, Luiziânia, Palmares Paulista, Pedrinhas, Piacatu, Planalto, Pontes Gestal, Praia da Lagoinha, Riolândia, Sales, Santópolis do Aguapeí, Sarutaiá, Taiaçu, Tapiratiba, Taquaral and Vista Alegre do Alto (1982)
- Adolfo, Álvaro de Carvalho, Arealva, Boracéia, Divinolândia, Mariápolis, Nova Guataporanga, Paulicéia, Pinhalzinho, Porto Primavera, Praia do Juqueí, Presidente Alves, Salto Grande, Santa Mercedes, São João do Pau d'Alho, São Luiz do Paraitinga and Ubirajara (1982)
- Restinga and Três Fronteiras (1983)
- Catiguá, Piquerobi, Polvilho and Ribeirão do Sul (1984)

In 1985, automatic exchanges were deployed in the last 38 cities that were still served by manual exchanges, installed in a standard building of the PTC-600 type:

- Alto Alegre, Balbinos, Barra do Turvo, Borá, Caiuá, Estrela do Norte, Flora Rica, Gabriel Monteiro, Itaju, Itapura, Lucianópolis, Marinópolis, Mirassolândia, Monções, Narandiba, Nipoã, Nova Independência, Nova Luzitânia, Ocauçu, Óleo, Onda Verde, Pedranópolis, Platina, Rubiácea, Rubinéia, Sagres, Sandovalina, Santa Clara d'Oeste, Santana da Ponte Pensa, São Francisco, São João das Duas Pontes, Sebastianópolis do Sul, Tarabai, Tejupá, Turiúba, Turmalina, União Paulista and Uru

From the late 1980s, the small digital exchanges of the TRÓPICO-R series (Promon and PHT) and CPR (Equitel) began to be deployed; they were modular and installed in transportable containers.

Automation of telephone exchanges
Year	Cities with automatic exchanges	Cities with manual exchanges	Cities without telephone systems
1973	145	317	66
1974 (Note: Including COTESP automatic exchanges)	215	262	51
1975	233	257	38
1976 (Note: Including Rafard, which stopped sharing Capivari's exchange)	257	244	28
1977	332	184	13
1978	363	164	2
1979	400	129	–
1980 (Note: Including Barueri, which stopped sharing Carapicuíba's exchange)	412	118	–
1981	450	80	–
1982	487	43	–
1983	489	41	–
1984	492	38	–
1985	530	–	–
1988 (Note: Including Igaraçu do Tietê, which stopped sharing Barra Bonita's exchange)	531	–	–
1989 (Note: Including Vargem Grande Paulista, which stopped sharing Cotia's exchange)	532	–	–

=== Buildings ===
Telesp used several types of standard buildings, which were designed for the sole purpose of housing telephone exchanges, according to their size:

- For the larger exchanges, various types of masonry buildings were used, such as the standard buildings PTC1, PTC2, PTC4, 10KT, 20KT, 40KT, 50KT, 80KT, etc.
- For smaller exchanges, containers were used, as well as modular or masonry buildings, such as the standard buildings PLAD, PTC, PTRI, 4KT, etc.

The telephone exchange buildings are still used today by Vivo, but they are real-estate assets subject to reversion (reversible assets).

=== Area cuts ===
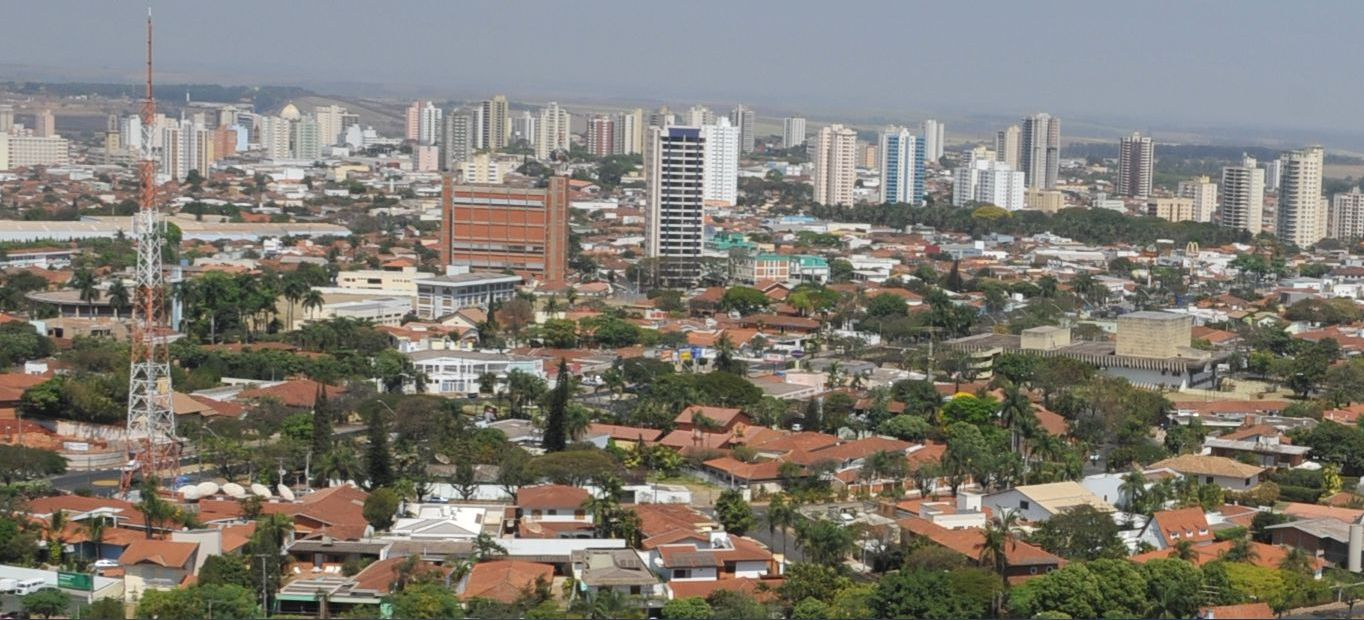
View of the city of Araraquara, with the Fonte Luminosa telephone exchange in the foreground.

As the telecommunications plant expanded, capacity for additional telephone exchanges was exhausted in areas of highest telephone demand, necessitating the construction of new exchanges to serve the growing number of users.

Thus, when a new telephone exchange was built within the service area of a single existing one, the customers who were farthest from the old exchange and closest to the new one were reassigned to it, freeing up terminals for new customers near the old exchange and increasing service capacity within the area.

This reassignment of telephone terminals from one telephone exchange to another was called an area cut. When the cuts occurred, the telephones reassigned to the new exchange had their prefixes and the thousands digit(s) of their numbers changed.

In the capital, given its enormous demand for telephones, area cuts were frequent. In the other cities, before Telesp was created, they had only been carried out in Santos. Most of the area cuts were made in the 1990s due to the major telephone expansion, with hundreds of new exchanges inaugurated to meet existing demand for telephones.

List of the first area cuts in the main cities served by Telesp (except the capital):

- Santos – with no possibility of expanding the city's first automatic exchange, CTB inaugurated the Tocantins exchange in 1948 and later inaugurated the Washington Luís exchange in 1971, to which the telephones from the two older exchanges were later reassigned. Telesp carried out new area cuts, with the inauguration of the José Menino and Ponta da Praia exchanges in 1977, and Areia Branca in 1982
- Campinas – the city where Telesp made the first area cuts in the interior, with the inauguration of the Cambuí and Castelo exchanges in 1976, and Campos Elíseos in 1984
- Bauru – inauguration of the Altos da Cidade exchange in 1977

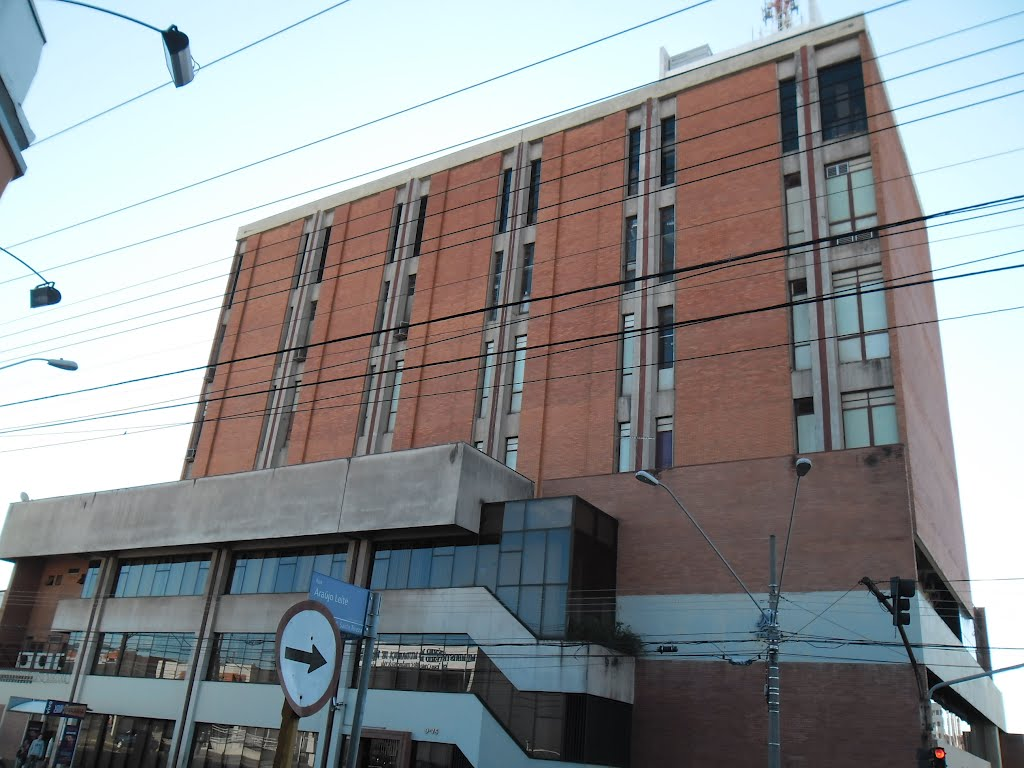
Altos da Cidade telephone exchange.

- Jundiaí – inauguration of the Vila Arens exchanges in 1982, and Vila Industrial in 1989
- Guarulhos – inauguration of the Cumbica exchange in 1984
- São José dos Campos – inauguration of the Jardim Satélite exchanges in 1984, and Tatetuba in 1988
- Araraquara – inauguration of the Fonte Luminosa exchange in 1984

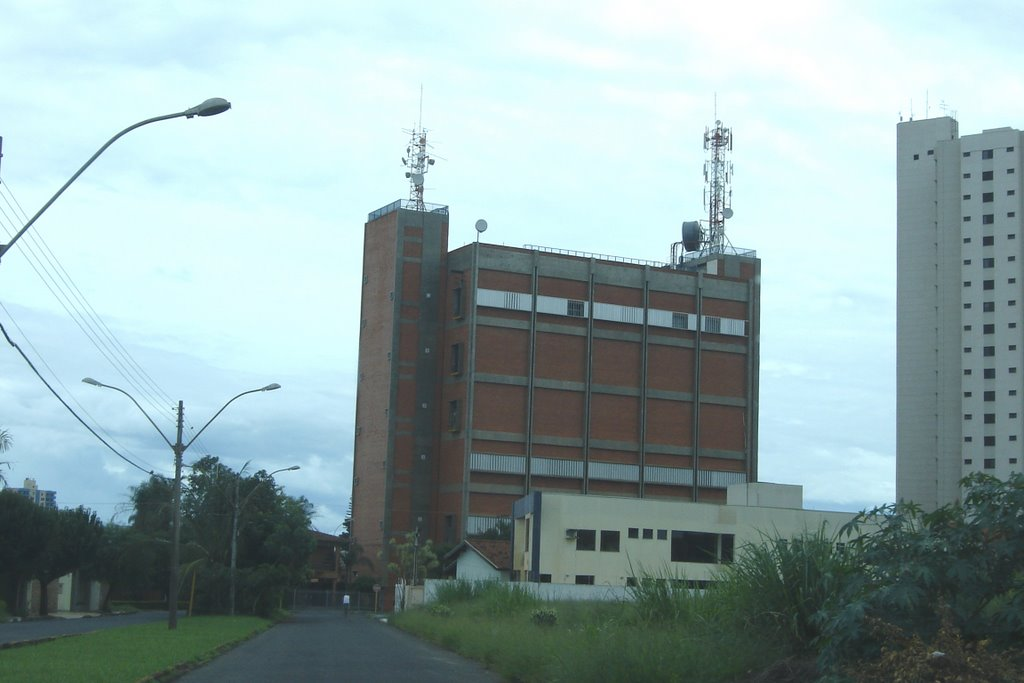
Fonte Luminosa telephone exchange.

- Barueri – the cut was made in the area of the Alphaville exchange, with the inauguration of the Barueri exchange in 1984
- Itu – inauguration of the Tiradentes exchange in 1984
- Piracicaba – inauguration of the Vila Resende exchange in 1987
- Carapicuíba – inauguration of the Vila Dirce exchange in 1988
- Sorocaba – inauguration of the Cerrado exchange in 1989

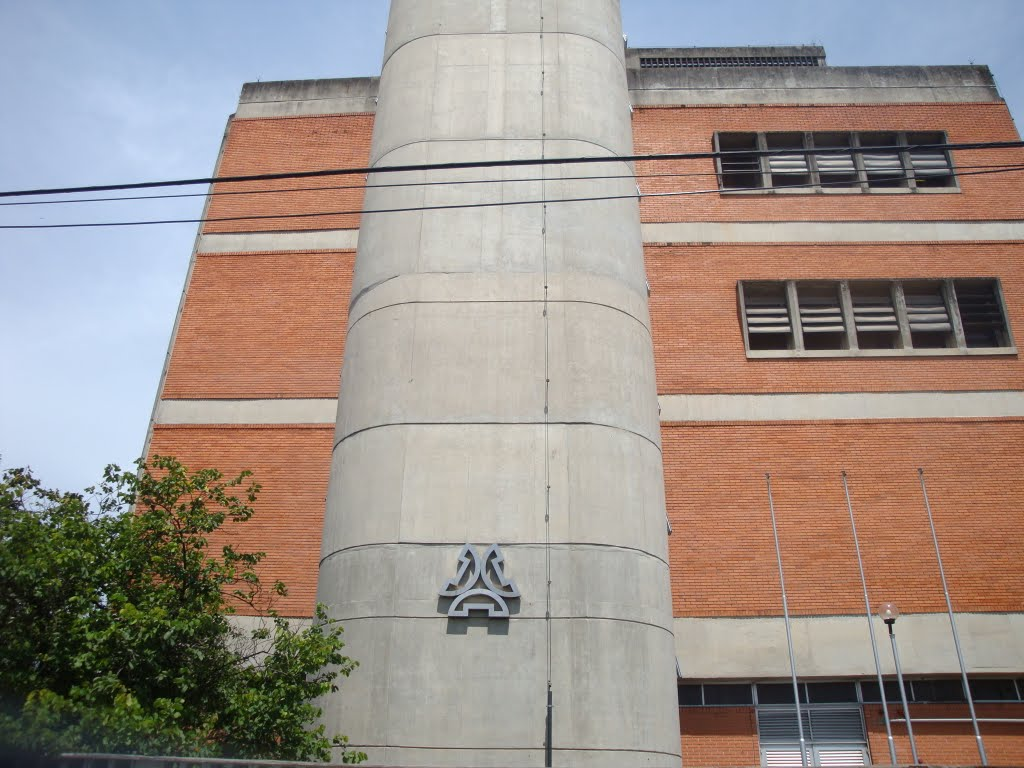
Cerrado telephone exchange.

- São José do Rio Preto – inauguration of the Maceno and Redentora exchanges in 1991
- Americana – inauguration of the Praia Azul and Praia dos Namorados exchanges in 1991
- Santa Bárbara d'Oeste – inauguration of the Jardim Esmeralda exchange in 1995

In other important cities such as Araçatuba, Jacareí, Marília, Osasco, Presidente Prudente, Rio Claro, São Carlos, São Vicente and Taubaté all the area cuts were made in the 1990s.

Of the main cities served by Telesp, only Limeira had no area cuts due to the large capacity of the telephone exchange building.

Some cities had more than one telephone exchange, but these were not area cuts; rather, they were service to regions that did not have telephone systems, such as the Hortolândia and Nova Veneza exchanges in Sumaré.

There were also cities that already had more than one exchange installed by the previous operator in areas that lacked service, and these were replaced by Telesp with new exchanges, such as the Granja Viana exchange in Cotia, the Enseada and Vicente de Carvalho exchanges in Guarujá, and the Cidade Ocian, Solemar and Vila Caiçara, exchanges in Praia Grande.

There was also an area cut in the case of cities that shared the telephone exchange of a nearby city for technical convenience, as in the case of Barueri, which shared the exchange of Carapicuíba until an area cut was made, with the inauguration of the Alphaville telephone exchange in 1980, as well as Igaraçu do Tietê, which shared the exchange of Barra Bonita until 1988, and Vargem Grande Paulista, which shared the exchange of Cotia until 1989.

=== Rural cooperatives ===
After the pioneering initiative of the Cooperativa Rural de Telecomunicações de Mogi das Cruzes (operating area of the Companhia Telefônica da Borda do Campo), when two rural automatic telephone exchanges were inaugurated in 1975, the way was opened for rural telecommunications cooperatives to emerge across the state with the same initiative to solve the communications problem among their members through the implementation of rural telephony systems.

The projects were designed and executed by the Department of Water and Electric Energy (DAEE) in partnership with Telesp, and in total 17 rural cooperatives benefited.

Telesp began to assume operation of these systems from the late 1970s, most in 1981 (8 exchanges) and 1982 (15 exchanges), until in 1985 the Plano Diretor de Telecomunicações Rurais was launched for work in the area.

Among the rural telephone exchanges installed, the one in the former rural nucleus of Holambra stands out; it, at the time, belonged to the municipalities of Jaguariúna and Artur Nogueira, and in 1993 became a municipality.

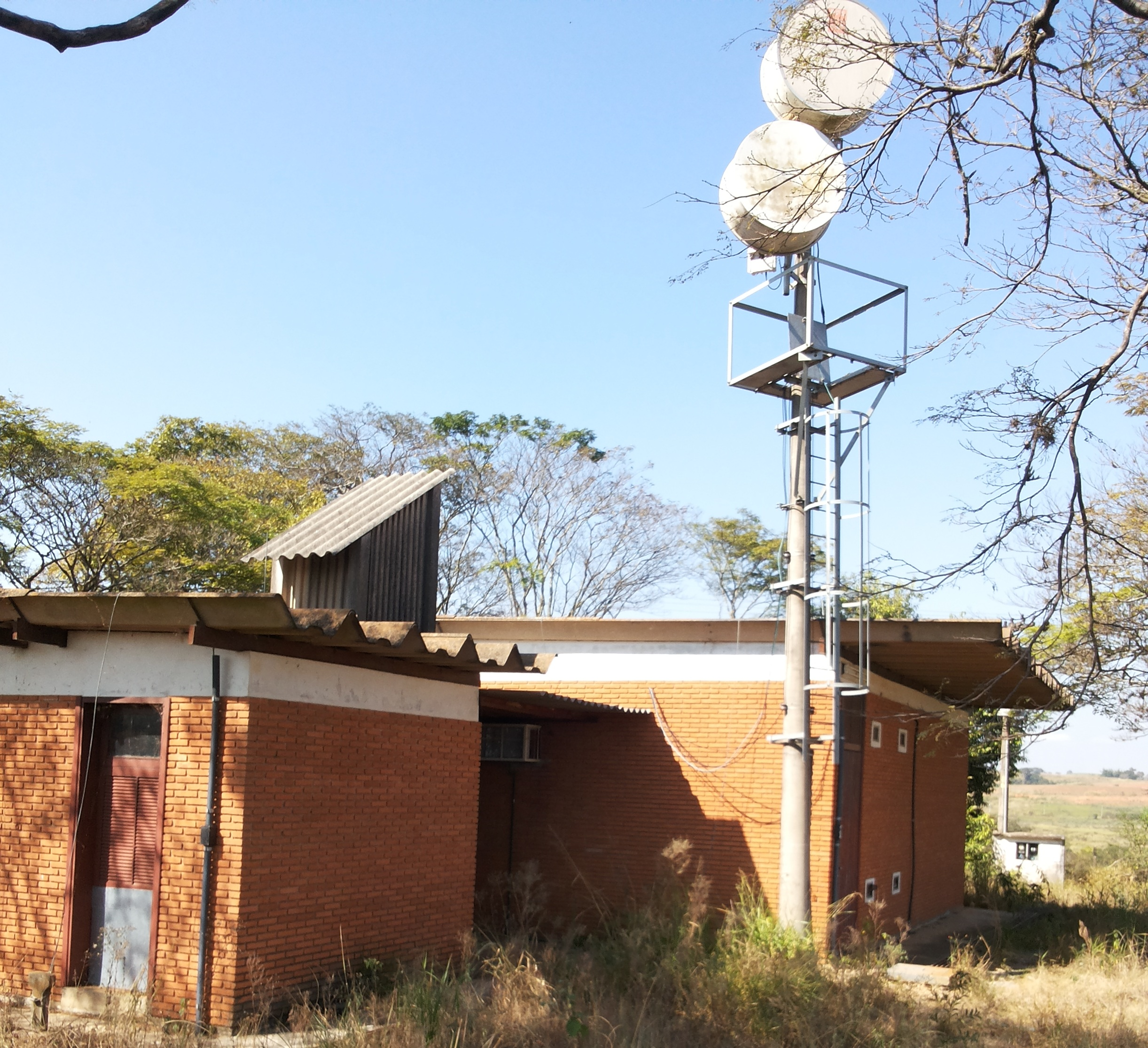
Horto Florestal rural exchange at km 139 of the Anhanguera Highway in Limeira.

Rural cooperative	Rural exchange
Cortemc – Coop. Rural Telecom. Mogi das Cruzes	Cocuera; Pindorama; Lambari (deactivated)
Cortenep – Coop. Rural Telecom. Nordeste Paulista	Alvorada; Cachoeiro; Maracanã
Cortelju – Coop. Rural Telecom. Região Jundiaí	Engordador; Terra Nova
Cortelim – Coop. Rural Telecom. Itu Mairinque	Europa; Taquaral
Coterso – Coop. Telef. Rural Região Sorocabana	Águia da Castelo; Ipanema; Itavuvu
Cetril – Coop. Eletrif. Telef. Rurais Ibiúna	Rio Una
Cetert – Coop. Eletrif. Telef. Rurais Tapiraí	Faz. São Paulo; Liberdade
Ceripa – Coop. Eletrif. Telef. Rurais Itaí Paranapanema Avaré	Holambra II; Jurumirim
Cetrur – Coop. Eletrif. Telef. Rurais Registro	Carapiranga
Cetermm – Coop. Eletrif. Telef. Rurais Região Mogi Mirim	Holambra
Cortelpa – Coop. Rural Telecom. Região Paulista	Horto Florestal; Praia Azul (deactivated)
Cetersj – Coop. Eletrif. Telef. Rurais São João da Boa Vista	Capituba
Cortevalp – Coop. Rural Telecom. Vale do Rio Pardo	Canoas; Morro do Cruzeiro; Faz. Varginha (deactivated); Visor (deactivated)
Cotersc – Coop. Telef. Rural Região São Carlos	Babilônia; Varjão
Corterc – Coop. Rural Telecom. Região Central Est. São Paulo	Faz. Santa Cruz
Coteralp – Coop. Telef. Rural Alta Paulista	União (deactivated)

== Telephone numbering ==
Before the implementation of the DDD system, long-distance calls were made almost entirely via operator, and there was no need for telephone numbers to have prefixes, except in cities with more than one exchange. In Telesp's operating area, telephone numbers without a prefix were used until 1989 in municipal seats and until 1994 in other localities.

Manual exchanges

In manual exchanges, telephone numbers did not have a prefix and varied as follows: between 01 and 099 and between 100 and 999 in exchanges of the former concession Cia. Telefônica Alta Paulista, between 1 and 999 in most exchanges, and only in some specific cases between 1000 and 9999.

Automatic exchanges (without prefix)

In automatic exchanges without a prefix, telephone numbers varied as follows: between 20 and 99 in the smallest localities, between 200 and 999 in most cities, and between 1000 and 9999 in medium and large cities.

Automatic exchanges (with prefix)

Until 1969, the city of São Paulo used two-digit prefixes (the oldest) and, from 1967 onwards, three-digit prefixes, which were the first in the country in this format (they were also the first in the state to be integrated into DDD, in 1970). In Greater São Paulo, besides the capital, only the cities of the ABC Region, Guarulhos and Osasco had exchanges with prefixes (two-digit prefixes beginning with 4x). These same cities later formed São Paulo's tertiary area.

In the other areas, only the cities of Santos, Cubatão, Guarujá, São Vicente, Campinas, Sorocaba, and Votorantim had exchanges with prefixes, and of only one digit.

In view of the implementation of DDD from 1970 onwards, all automatic exchanges inaugurated by CTB in the interior came to use one-digit prefixes. COTESP began to use one-digit prefixes in the larger automatic exchanges inaugurated from 1971 onwards and in all exchanges, including small ones, from 1973 onwards.

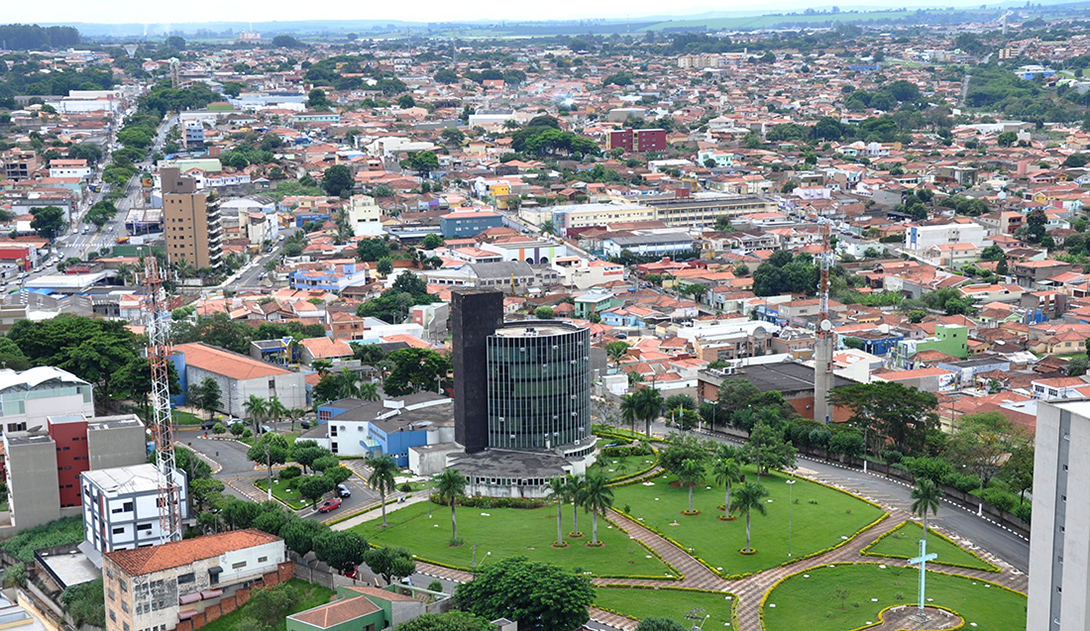
View of the city of Mogi Guaçu with the telephone exchange on the right.

They soon began to be replaced by Telesp with two-digit prefixes so that the telephone system could be expanded, and the last to be replaced were the "8" prefix of Campinas changed to "34" (1993), the "2" also of Campinas changed to "36" (1994) and the "4" of Santos changed to "284" (1995).

Telephone numbers in exchanges with one-digit prefixes ranged between 2–0000 and 9–9999.

As soon as Telesp assumed operations, it began using two-digit prefixes in the medium- and large-capacity automatic exchanges being activated in the interior. Marília was the only exception; even after receiving the DDD system in 1973, its telephone numbers remained without a prefix until a new exchange was inaugurated in 1978 (prefix "33").

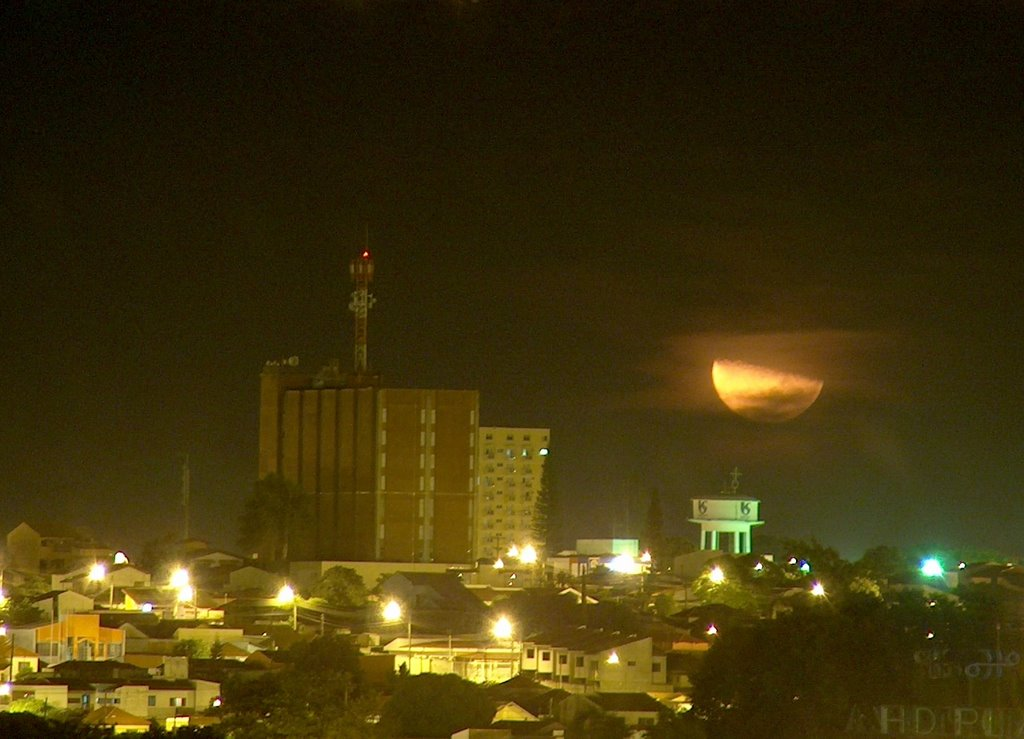
Night view of the city of Assis with the telephone exchange in the foreground.

Between 1976 and 1977, all automatic exchanges, including small ones, as they were already prepared for DDD, were activated with two-digit prefixes; some exchanges in the Sorocaba and Itapeva areas were activated with three-digit prefixes (later changed to two digits). But from 1978 onwards, small telephone exchanges began to be activated without telephone prefixes, only receiving two-digit prefixes with the implementation of DDD.

Telephone numbers in exchanges with two-digit prefixes ranged between 20–0000 and 99–9999.

In Greater São Paulo and surroundings (which encompassed São Paulo's tertiary areas, Cotia, Jundiaí, and Mogi das Cruzes), whose telephone demand was much higher, automatic exchanges were already activated with three-digit prefixes and area code (011), to rationalize the long-distance system and carry out the operational integration of Greater São Paulo.

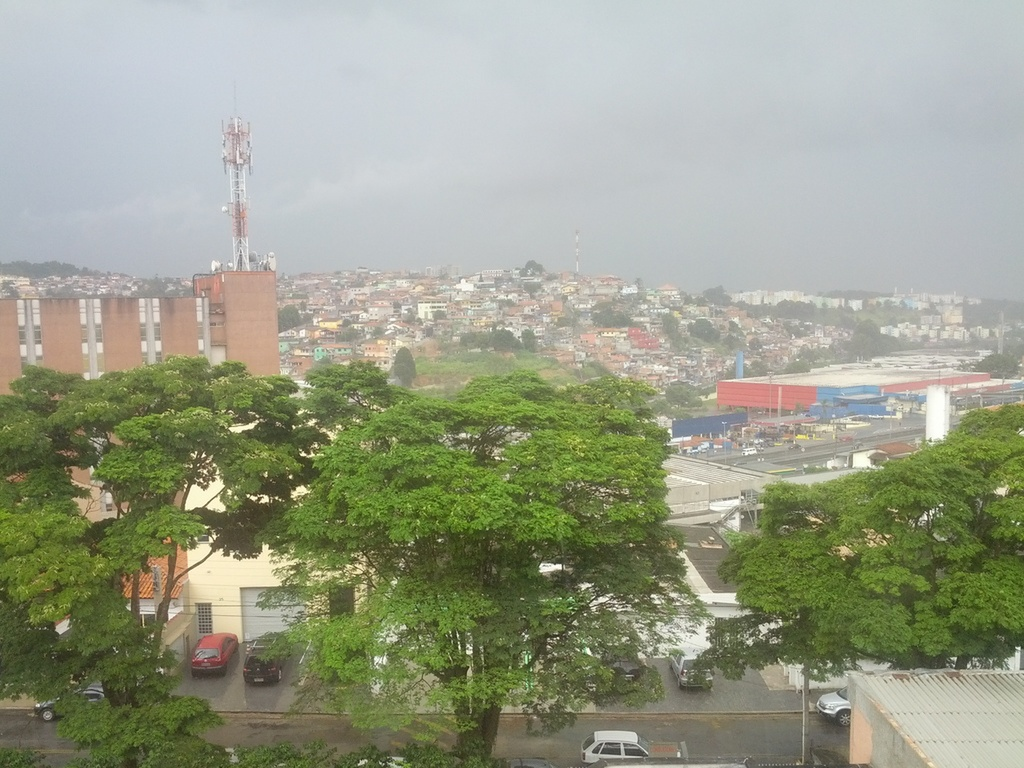
View of the city of Cotia with the telephone exchange on the left.

In the São Paulo area, prefixes beginning with 2xx were used in the Center, North Zone and in Guarulhos, 5xx in the South Zone, 8xx in the West Zone and in Osasco (later replaced by 70x in Osasco), and 9xx in the East Zone and in Guarulhos (later replaced by 6xx). In the Cotia area prefixes beginning with 42x, 49x, 72x, and 79x were used, and in the Jundiaí area those beginning with 40x, 43x, 48x, 73x, and 78x.

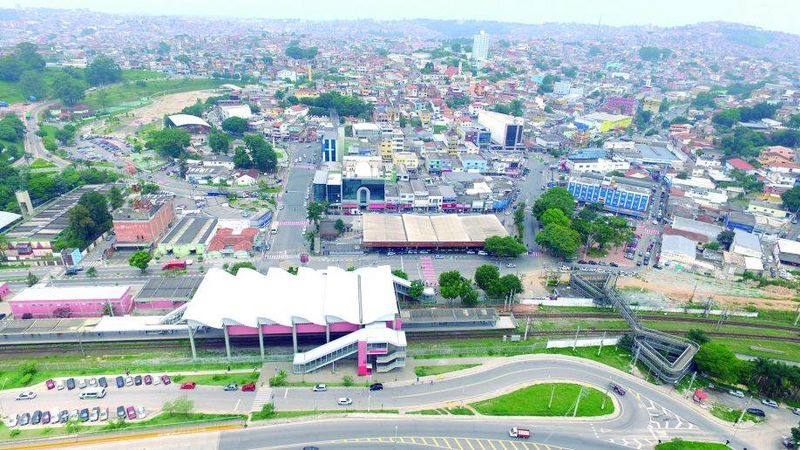
View of the city of Jandira with the telephone exchange on the left.

In the northeast of the state, where Telesp held concessions in the Ribeirão Preto and Franca areas, together with CETERP and CTBC, the pattern initially followed two-digit prefixes. Still, it later shifted to three digits for standardization with those operators.

Telephone numbers in exchanges with three-digit prefixes ranged between 201–0000 and 999–9999.

The last cities to have a telephone prefix are among those that were integrated into DDD in 1989: Balbinos, Borá, Marinópolis, Monções, Nova Independência, Nova Luzitânia, Óleo, Pedranópolis, Platina, Rubiácea, São Francisco, São João das Duas Pontes, Sebastianópolis do Sul, Tejupá, Turmalina, União Paulista and Uru, which received automatic exchanges in 1985, together with Álvares Florence, Anhumas, Florínea, Guarantã, Lavínia, Luís Antônio, Lutécia, Porangaba, Rifaina and Valentim Gentil, which received automatic exchanges before 1985.

In the 1980s, to implement Direct dial collect (DDC) and Direct dial toll-free (DDG) systems, exchanges with the prefix "90" and those with prefixes beginning with "80x" had their prefixes changed. And in the early 1990s, for the implementation of the cellular telephone system, exchanges with the prefix "97", some with "98", and those with prefixes beginning with 9xx had their prefixes changed.

From 1995 onwards, Telesp began changing telephone numbering throughout the state to expand the network. In the (011) area, four-digit prefixes began to be implemented; in July of that year, the "61" prefix of the Campo Belo exchange was changed to "5561", making it the first four-digit telephone prefix in Brazil.

The prefixes were gradually replaced: in the capital, the 3xxx, 5xxx and 6xxx series were used (prefixes beginning with 6xxx were later replaced by 2xxx), and in the other cities the 7xxx series and later the 4xxx series (prefixes beginning with 7xxx were later replaced by 4xxx, except in Osasco, where prefixes beginning with 70xx and 720x were replaced by 36xx).

The other areas began to follow the national DDD standardization with three digits (012 to 019) and three-digit prefixes as well. The addition of the fourth digit to telephone prefixes in these areas began in 2000 and was completed in December 2005.

== DDD/DDI systems ==
In the early 1970s, the direct distance dialing (DDD) system began to be implemented throughout the country. At the beginning, several cities received inbound DDD; that is, they only received long-distance calls via DDD from other cities, but could not place calls via DDD; those had to be made via an operator. Later, they received outbound DDD, enabling them to place long-distance calls to other cities through their telephone exchange without needing an operator. But the vast majority of cities received the complete inbound and outbound system at once.

Also in the 1970s, Brazil integrated into the international direct dialing (DDI) system through Embratel's Earth station in Tanguá. The satellite communications system was expanded in 1976 with the inauguration of the Satellite Monitoring Station, also located in Tanguá.

=== Tertiary and tariff areas ===
The Ministry of Communications created the National Telephony Plan, which was approved and began implementation in 1972. Under it, the states would be divided into Operational Districts, whose objective, among others, was to facilitate control and calls.

In each of these districts, there would be at least one Transit Exchange, which would allow national calls through the direct distance dialing (DDD) system. Also, in each Operational District, the most important cities in the region would be connected to the Transit Exchanges, forming links between them.

The operational districts were composed of one or more tertiary areas, which are a set of cities grouped in a closed numbering region, and each of them corresponds to a national code in the DDD system.

The division of the state into tertiary areas was carried out for operational purposes, with the aim of establishing a specific numbering plan for each area. The numbering of the area codes (DDD) followed the Ministry of Communications' National Telephone Numbering Plan.

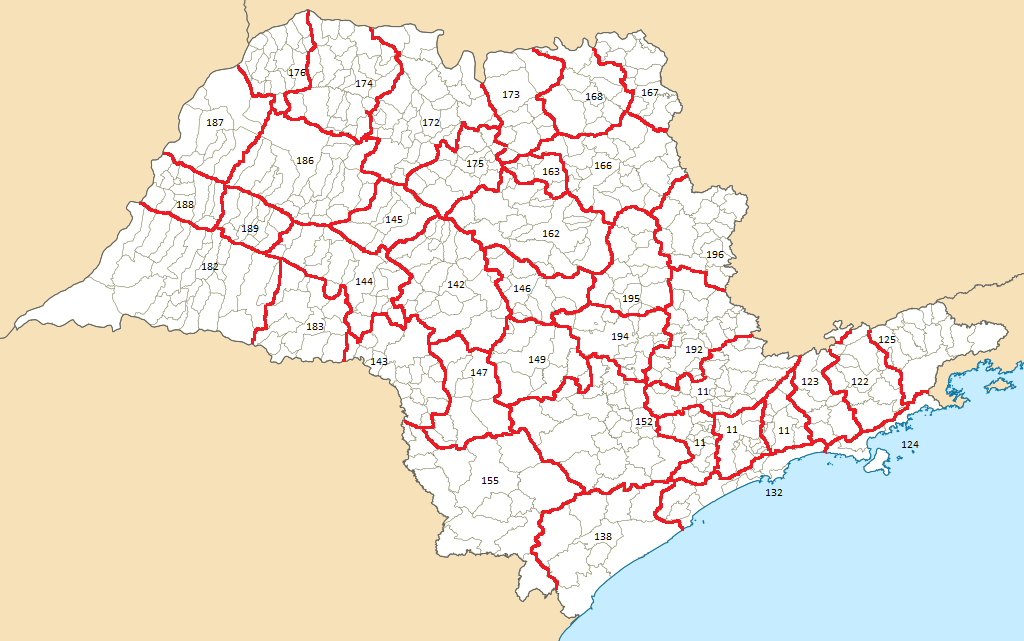
Tertiary areas of the state of São Paulo (1989).

The formation of each area depended on a series of planning factors, such as telephone traffic interests, the design of an appropriate switching plan, and the system's own economics. The tertiary areas presented two immediate advantages: speed and ease in telephone calls.

The cities within the same tertiary area integrated the Regional DDD, where calls between these cities could be made directly without the need to dial the area code before the telephone number. If the telephone exchange of a city already had a telephone prefix, which constituted the regional code of the city, even if the DDD system had not yet been implemented in that exchange, calls could also be made directly, but only within the regional scope of the tertiary area.

The intercity area-to-area charging system began to be developed from 1972, with studies carried out by Telebras together with the integration-holding companies of each state and Embratel, and being implemented in 1976 by the Ministry of Communications, dividing the states into tariff areas based on the tertiary areas.

The main city of each tariff area is called the area center, serving as the geodetic reference for the others when calculating long-distance intercity call charges. In cities within the same tariff area that integrated the Regional DDD, intercity calls between them were less expensive.

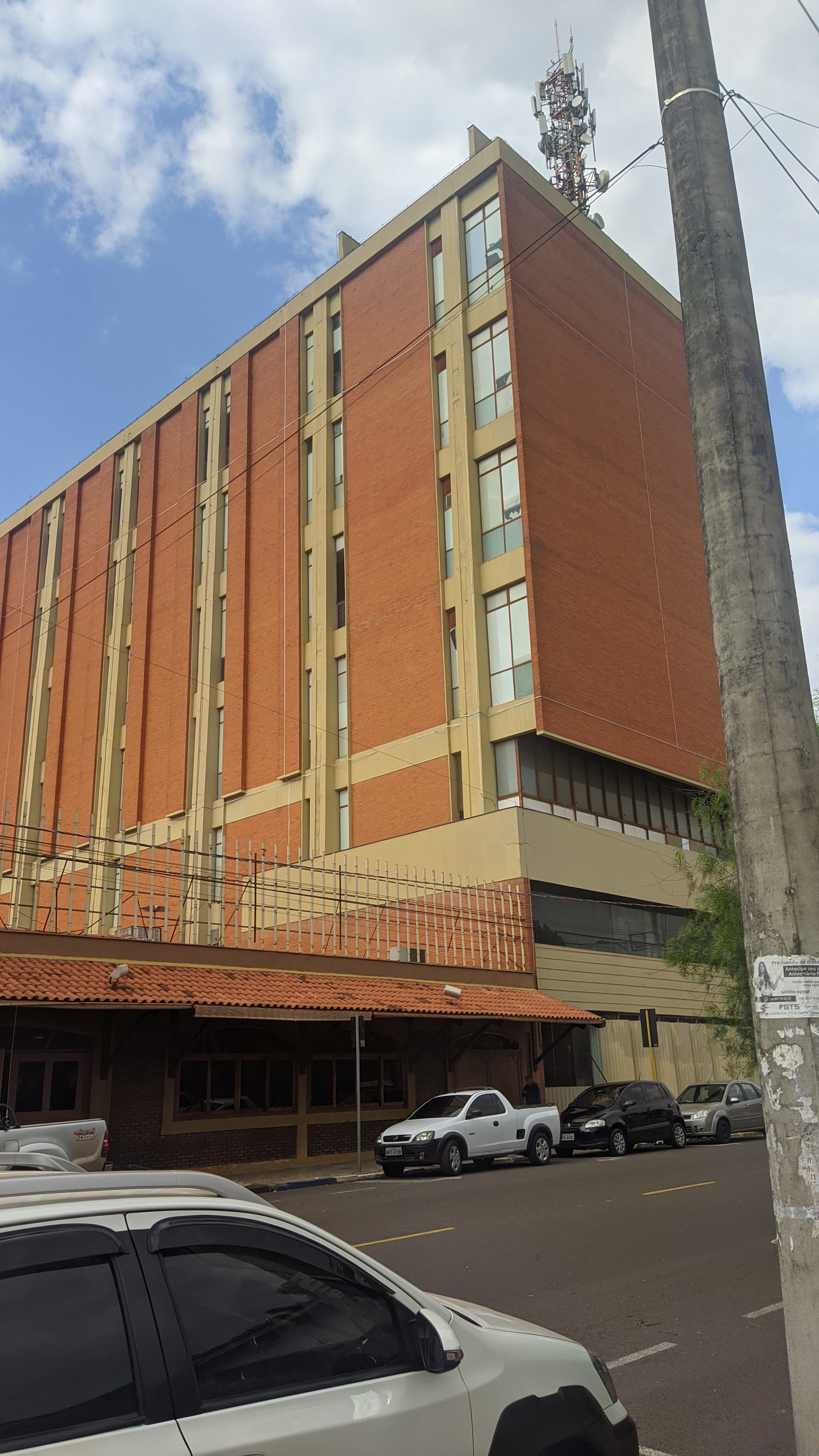
Telephone exchange of Araçatuba, center of tertiary area 0186.

The tariffing system underwent several updates, which included modifications related to geographic coordinates, harmonization of the numbering of tariff areas with the national telephone numbering plan, creation of new areas, merger of some areas, change of area-center localities, and relocation of a locality from one tariff area to another:

- the tariff areas of Cotia (133), Jundiaí (134), and Mogi das Cruzes (136) were integrated into the tariff area of São Paulo (11) in 1978, following the numbering plan that had already adopted the DDD code (011) for these areas, but the respective tertiary areas continued to exist
- the tertiary area of Registro was changed from (158) to (138) in 1979, following the numbering plan that had adopted the DDD code (0138) for the area
- Auriflama was part of the Jales area (176), but with the implementation of DDD in 1978, it became part of the Votuporanga area (174)
- Itariri and Pedro de Toledo were part of the Registro area (138), but with the implementation of incoming DDD in 1979 they became part of the Santos area (132)
- Juquitiba was part of the Registro area (138), but with the implementation of DDD in 1981, it became part of the Cotia area with DDD code (011)
- Salesópolis was part of the São José dos Campos area (123), but in the 1990s, it became part of the Mogi das Cruzes area, with the DDD code changed to (011)
- Fronteira was part of the São José do Rio Preto area (172), but in the 1990s, it became part of the Frutal area (344)

The tertiary areas of Ribeirão Preto (166) (Note: Only some municipalities received the code 0166 (including Ribeirão Preto); the other municipalities in this area received directly the code 016 because they were integrated into DDD after 1980) and Franca (167) (Note: Only the municipality of Franca received the code 0167; the other municipalities in this area received directly the code 016 because they were integrated into DDD after 1977) had their DDD code changed to (016). The São Joaquim da Barra area (168) had the DDD code implemented as (016), but despite the same DDD code, the tertiary areas continued to be distinct.

In the Mogi das Cruzes (11) and São Joaquim da Barra (168) areas, Telesp did not operate in any municipality. In São Paulo (11), Ribeirão Preto (166), Franca (167), and Barretos (173), Telesp operated in parts of the municipalities.

And although the DDD code (0176) was implemented in some cities of Mato Grosso do Sul, they were not part of the Jales area (176) but rather the Paranaíba (176-A) and Cassilândia (675-A) areas.

=== Telephone integration of Greater São Paulo ===
Telephone integration of the Greater São Paulo began in 1958 when, for intercity communications with the capital, CTBC introduced the automatic direct dialing system via coaxial cables, without assistance from operators, connecting the ABC cities to the IU station of the capital, located in the Edifício Sete de Abril. This was a system similar to the one used from Santos to São Paulo, inaugurated in the same year by CTB. At first, calls could only be made directly from the ABC to the capital, because in the reverse direction, operator assistance was still needed via code (07).

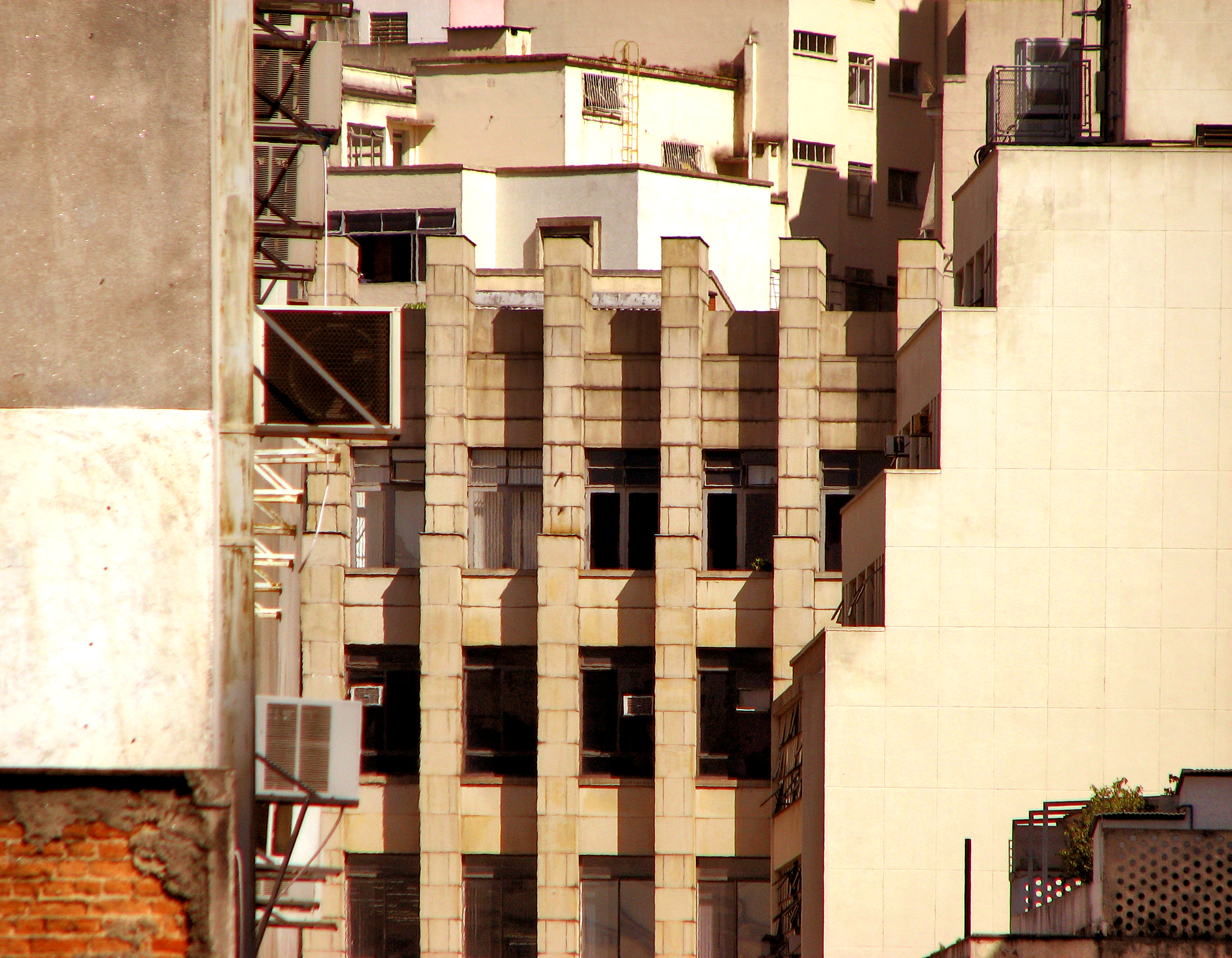
Detail of the facade of the Edifício Sete de Abril, former IU station of the capital.

The ABC localities were part of "line 4": São Caetano do Sul ("42"), Rudge Ramos ("42-7"), São Bernardo do Campo ("43"), Santo André ("44"), Diadema ("45"), Santa Terezinha ("46"), Mauá ("46-0"), and Ribeirão Pires ("46-7"). Also part of "line 4" were Osasco ("48") and Guarulhos ("49"). The prefixes of the telephone exchanges of "line 4" between 1972 and 1973 were replaced with three-digit prefixes, with an additional digit 4 added at the beginning of each prefix, except in Guarulhos, thereby standardizing with the system already adopted in the capital. It was the cities of "line 4" that constituted the São Paulo tertiary area (11). Consequently, in the implementation of the direct distance dialing (DDD) system, they were the first to receive the area code (011) after the capital. Around São Paulo, the tertiary areas of Santos (132), Cotia (133), Jundiaí (134), and Mogi das Cruzes (136) were created. Except the Santos tertiary area, which received the area code (0132), all the cities of the Cotia, Jundiaí, and Mogi das Cruzes tertiary areas received the area code (011) in the process of implementing the DDD system, following the National Telephone Numbering Plan, considerably increasing the number of cities in "line 4", aiming at telephone integration of the region.

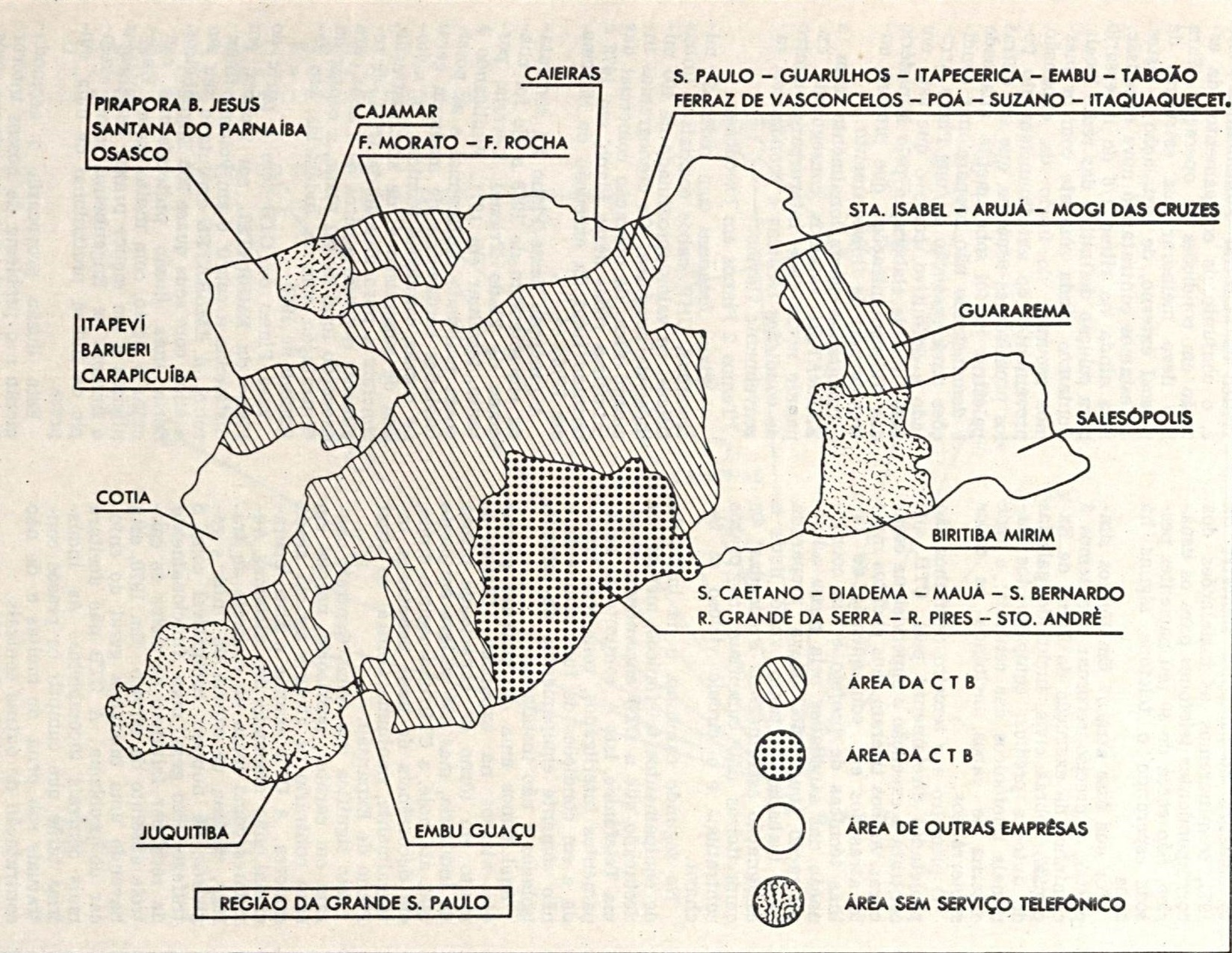
Telephone concessionaires in Greater São Paulo (1968).

Another problem to be solved was the number of operators working in Greater São Paulo. To rationalize the use of the intercity system and accelerate operational integration in Greater São Paulo, telephone operation in the region would be divided between CTB and CTBC. By federal decrees in 1969 the city of Suzano had its concession transferred to CTBC, and in 1970 the cities of Poá, Carapicuíba, Pirapora de Bom Jesus, Santana de Parnaíba, Jandira, Itapevi, Barueri, and Itapecerica da Serra were placed under CTB's concession. In 1973, CTB's concessions were transferred to Telesp, a holding company in the state that incorporated the other operators. From 1974 the process began of transferring the cities of the Mogi das Cruzes tertiary area under Telesp's concession to CTBC administration, while Mogi das Cruzes began to be served by CTBC in 1975. The cities of the Cotia and Jundiaí tertiary areas remained under Telesp's operation. In 1974, the city of Guarulhos was integrated into São Paulo's urban network. Thus, its calls to the capital became direct, without operator assistance, and were considered local, not intercity like the other cities on "line 4"; therefore, its telephone exchanges began to follow the capital's numbering sequence. The same happened with Osasco, which ceased to be part of "line 4" in 1979 and was integrated into São Paulo's urban network. The main forms of intercity communication were as follows:

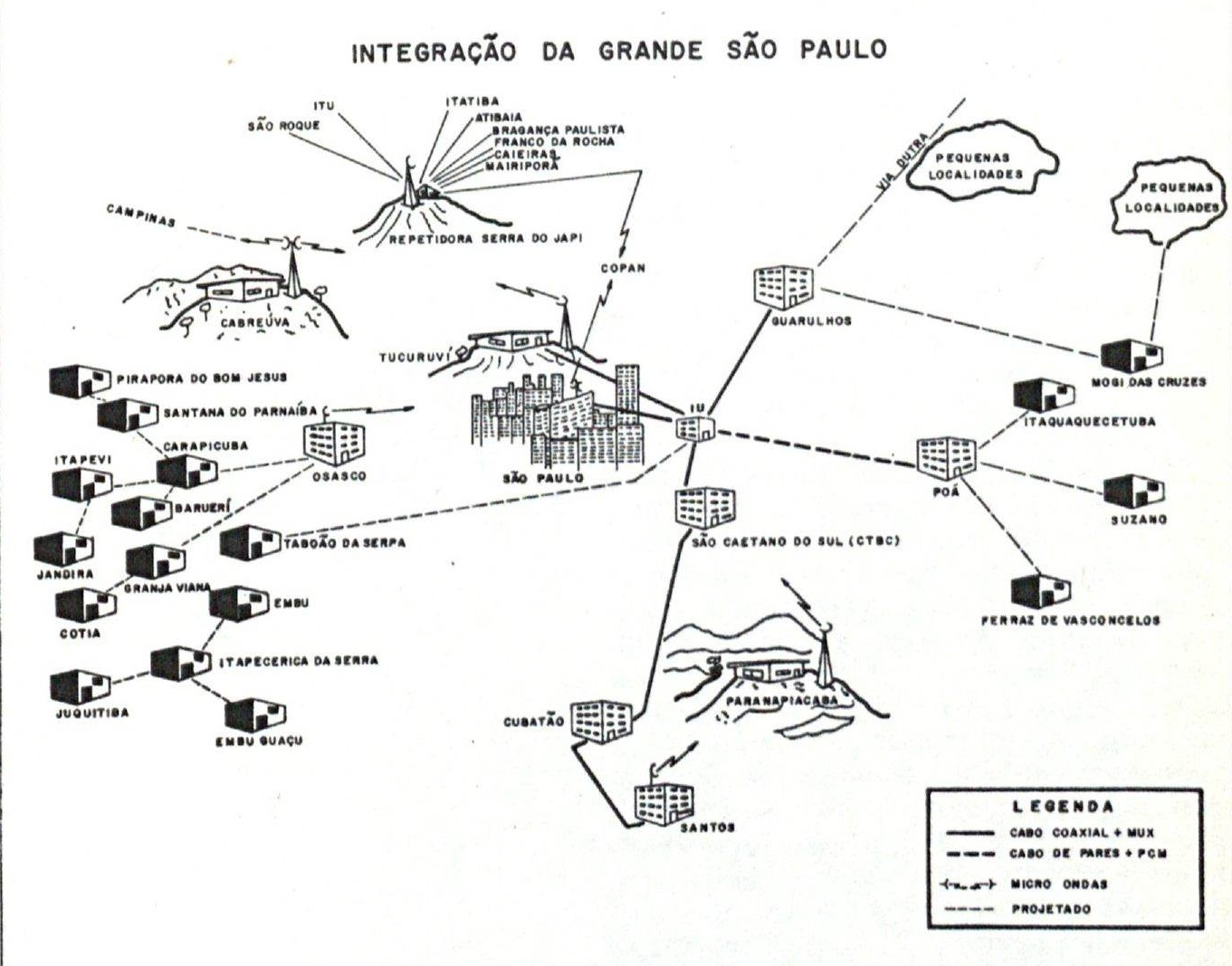
Telephone integration of Greater São Paulo.

- the capital's IU exchange, in the Edifício Sete de Abril, was connected by coaxial cables to the Tucuruvi repeater station, making a connection with all of Brazil through Embratel's microwave trunks
- the ABC region, via the São Caetano do Sul transit exchange, and the Santos area were connected to the capital's IU exchange and to each other by coaxial cables
- The city of Suzano was connected to the São Caetano do Sul transit exchange by microwave
- The city of Guarulhos and the Mogi das Cruzes area were connected to the capital's IU exchange and to each other by coaxial cables
- The Jundiaí area was connected to the Tucuruvi repeater station by microwave, via the Serra do Japi repeater station
- The Campinas area was connected to the Tucuruvi repeater station by microwave, via the Cabreúva repeater station
- coaxial cables connected the capital's IU exchange to the terminal station installed on the terrace of the Edifício Copan
- The Cotia area was connected to the Osasco transit exchange by coaxial cables, which were connected to the Copan terminal station by microwave
- The Santos area was connected to the Copan terminal station by microwave, via the Paranapiacaba repeater station

The cities were integrated into the DDD system in the following years:

- 1969 – only incoming DDD was implemented in São Paulo
- 1970/1971 – outgoing DDD was implemented in São Paulo, with an official inauguration in July 1970 broadcast live to the country by TV Tupi

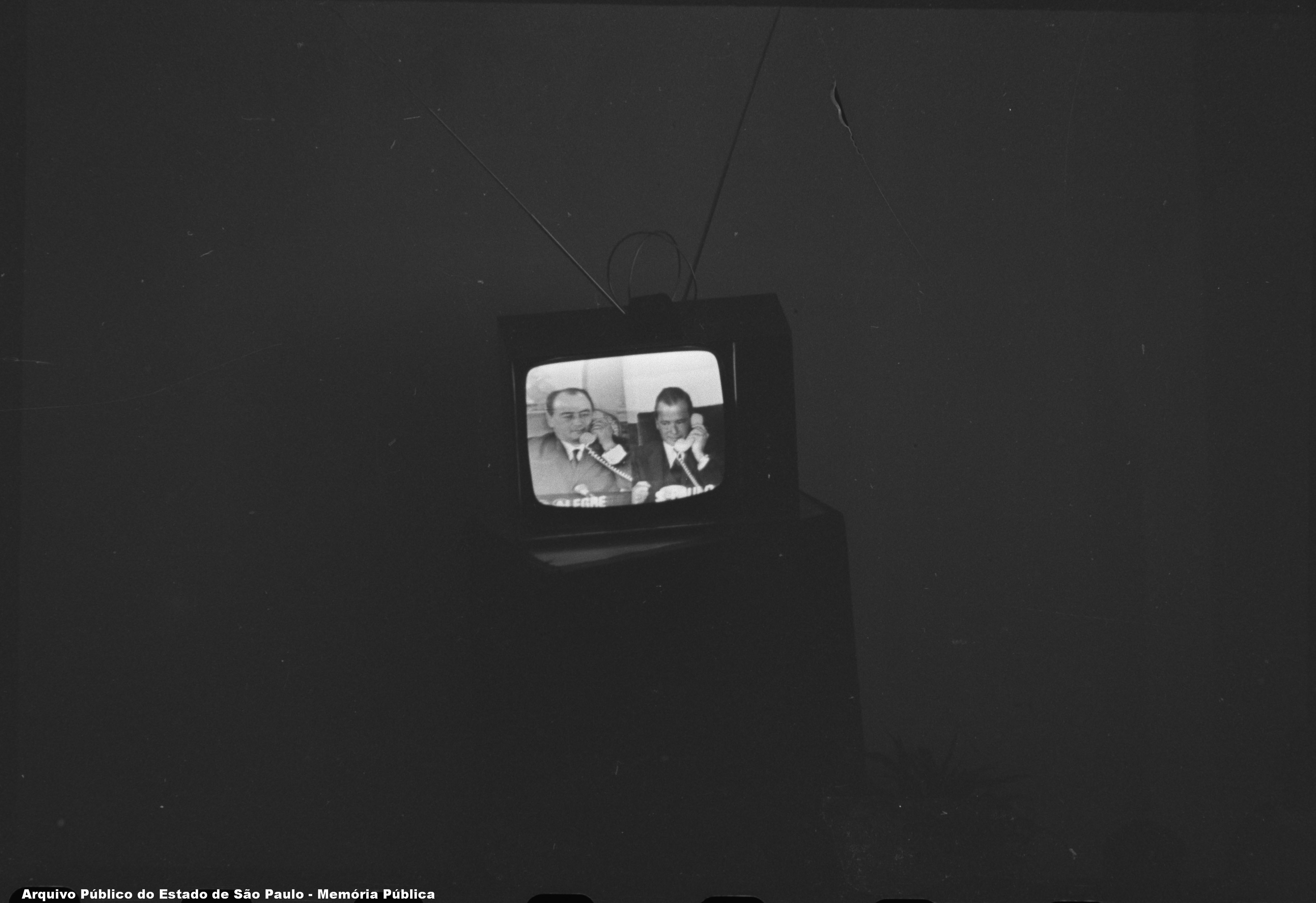
Inauguration of the DDD system in São Paulo with a live broadcast by TV Tupi (1970).

- 1973 – Diadema, Mauá, Ribeirão Pires, Rio Grande da Serra, Rudge Ramos, and Suzano (February), Santo André (June), Osasco (July), São Bernardo do Campo and São Caetano do Sul (October)

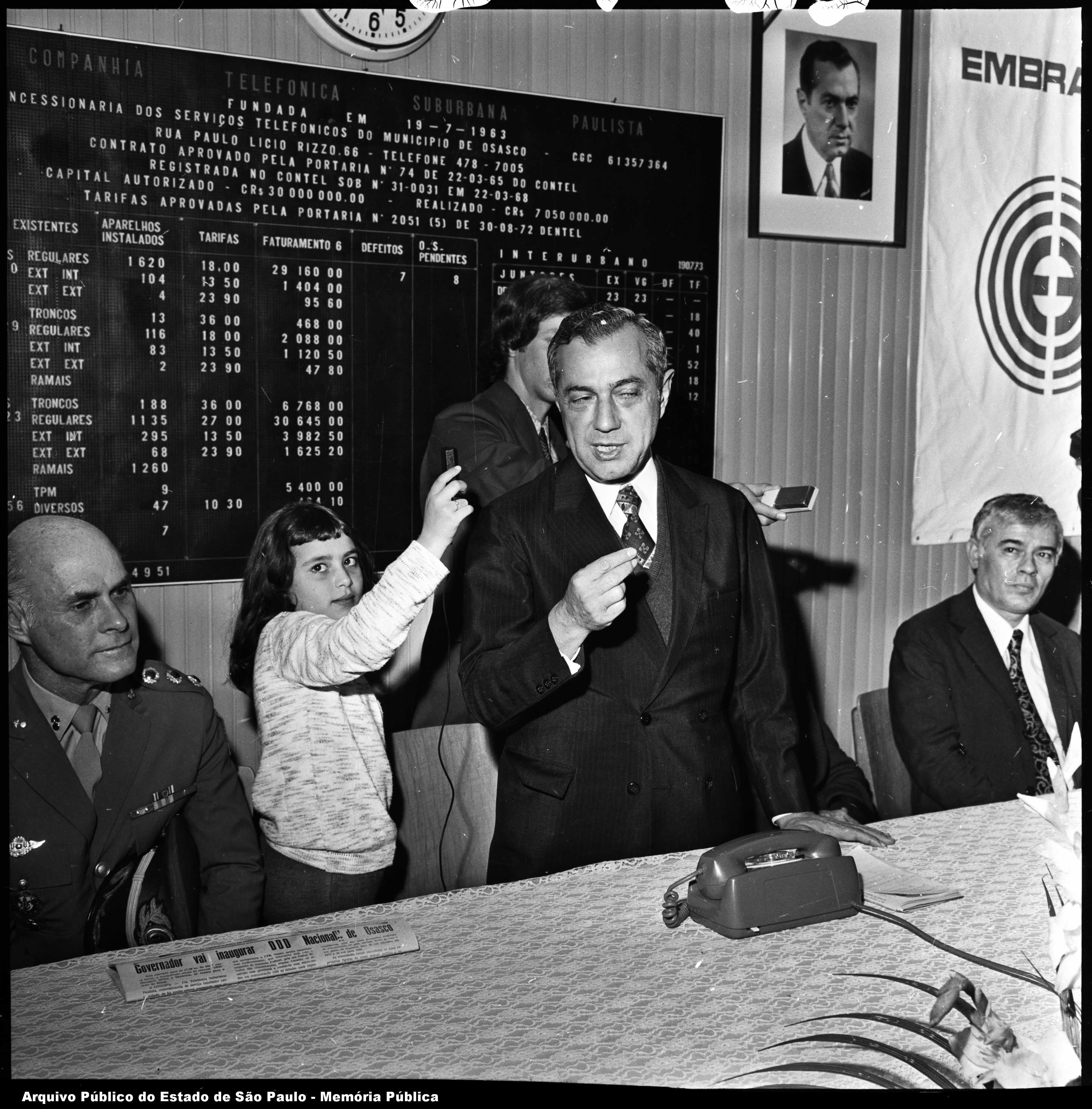
Inauguration of the DDD system in Osasco by Cotespa (1973).

- 1974 – Santa Terezinha (January), Itatiba – "incoming" (September), Itu – "incoming", Salto – "incoming", and São Roque – "incoming" (November)
- 1975 – Guarulhos (March), São Roque – "outgoing" (November), Franco da Rocha – "incoming"
- 1976 – Bragança Paulista (January), Poá (October), Ferraz de Vasconcelos (November), Barueri, Caieiras, Carapicuíba, Itaquaquecetuba, and Jundiaí (December)
- 1977 – Jandira and Salesópolis (July), Embu (September), Itu – "outgoing" (October), Cotia and Itapevi (December), São Lourenço da Serra
- 1978 – Mogi das Cruzes (January), Arujá (February), Guararema (March), Atibaia, Santa Isabel and Várzea Paulista (April), Campo Limpo Paulista, Itatiba – "outgoing", and Taboão da Serra (May), Itapecerica da Serra (June), Franco da Rocha – "outgoing" (July), Mairinque (August), Francisco Morato (September), Mairiporã (October)
- 1979 – Biritiba Mirim and Igaratá (March)
- 1980 – Embu-Guaçu, Jordanésia, Parque Petrópolis
- 1981 – Bairro do Jacaré, Cabreúva, Campos de Mairiporã, Itupeva, Jardim Cinco Lagos, Joanópolis, Juquitiba, Piracaia, Santana de Parnaíba, Terra Preta
- 1982 – Bom Jesus dos Perdões, Jarinu, Parque Suíço, Pinhalzinho, Pirapora do Bom Jesus
- 1983 – Nazaré Paulista, Vargem Grande Paulista
- 1984 – Morungaba
- 1988 – Pedra Bela

With the same area code (011), all the cities became part of the Regional DDD, allowing direct calls without area codes. Despite this convenience, calls between the capital area (São Paulo, Guarulhos, and Osasco) and the cities of "line 4", and between those cities themselves or to the São Paulo area, were intercity calls. The international direct dialing (DDI) system was inaugurated in February 1976 in São Paulo and in cities already integrated into DDD. In the other cities, DDI was installed together with DDD.

=== Deployment in the interior ===
When Telesp began operations, DDD had been implemented only in Santos, Cubatão, and Guarujá (May 1971 – incoming) and Presidente Prudente (June 1972). From May 1973, Telesp began implementing the DDD system in the cities of its concession area together with Embratel. The first cities were Santos (May 1973 – outgoing), Marília (June 1973), Bauru, Botucatu, São Manuel, and Taubaté (August 1973), São José dos Campos (December 1973), Cubatão and Guarujá (June 1974 – outgoing), Tremembé (August 1974), and Avaré (November 1974), with the implementation process intensifying from 1975 onward. In this period, some cities were integrated into the DDD system before their incorporation by Telesp: Sorocaba (June 1973), Campos do Jordão (April 1974) and São Vicente (July 1974).

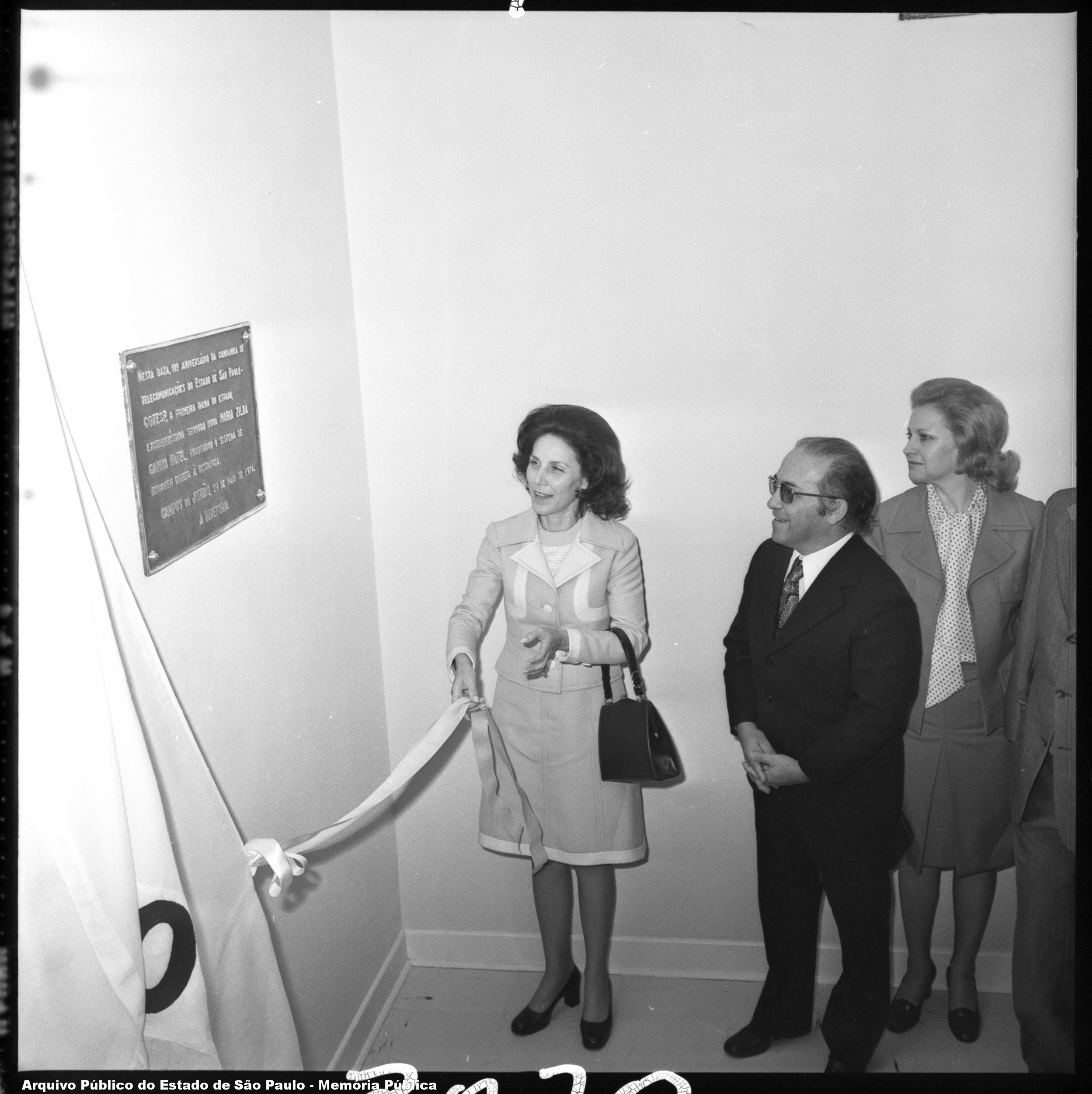
Inauguration of the DDD system in Campos do Jordão by COTESP (1974).

In 1975, the following were integrated into the national DDD system: • Araraquara, Caçapava, Campinas, Cruzeiro, Franca, Garça, Lençóis Paulista, Lorena, Piracicaba, Rio Claro • incoming DDD: Itapetininga, Itapeva, Sertãozinho, Tatuí, Votorantim During 1976, the following were integrated into the national DDD system: • Águas da Prata, Barretos, Caraguatatuba, Ilhabela, Jaboticabal, Paulínia, Quiririm, São Francisco da Praia, São João da Boa Vista, São José do Rio Preto, São Sebastião, Taquaritinga, Ubatuba In 1977 the following localities entered DDD:

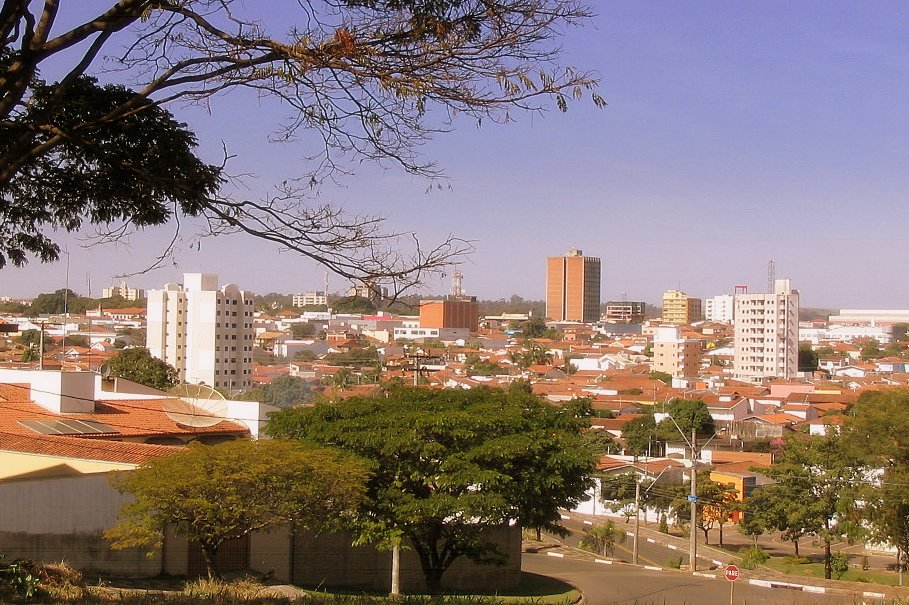
View of the city of Araras with the telephone exchange in the center of the image.

• Agudos, Amparo, Andradina, Araçatuba, Araras, Arcadas, Bebedouro, Cachoeira Paulista, Cardoso, Dois Córregos, Fernandópolis, Guaratinguetá, Indaiatuba, Jacareí, José Bonifácio, Lençóis Paulista (outgoing), Martinópolis, Matão, Mirandópolis, Mogi Mirim, Monte Aprazível, Nhandeara, Olímpia, Pederneiras, Penápolis, Pereira Barreto, Piquete, Presidente Venceslau, Rancharia, Santo Anastácio, Serra Negra, Sertãozinho (outgoing), Tanabi, Votuporanga As per the agreement signed in October 1973 under Telebras coordination, cities with more than 10 thousand inhabitants were to be interconnected to DDD by 1980, the last large and medium-sized cities to receive the system were Americana and Sumaré (1978), Limeira, Praia Grande, and Santa Bárbara d'Oeste (1979), and São Carlos (1980). In 1978 the following localities entered DDD:

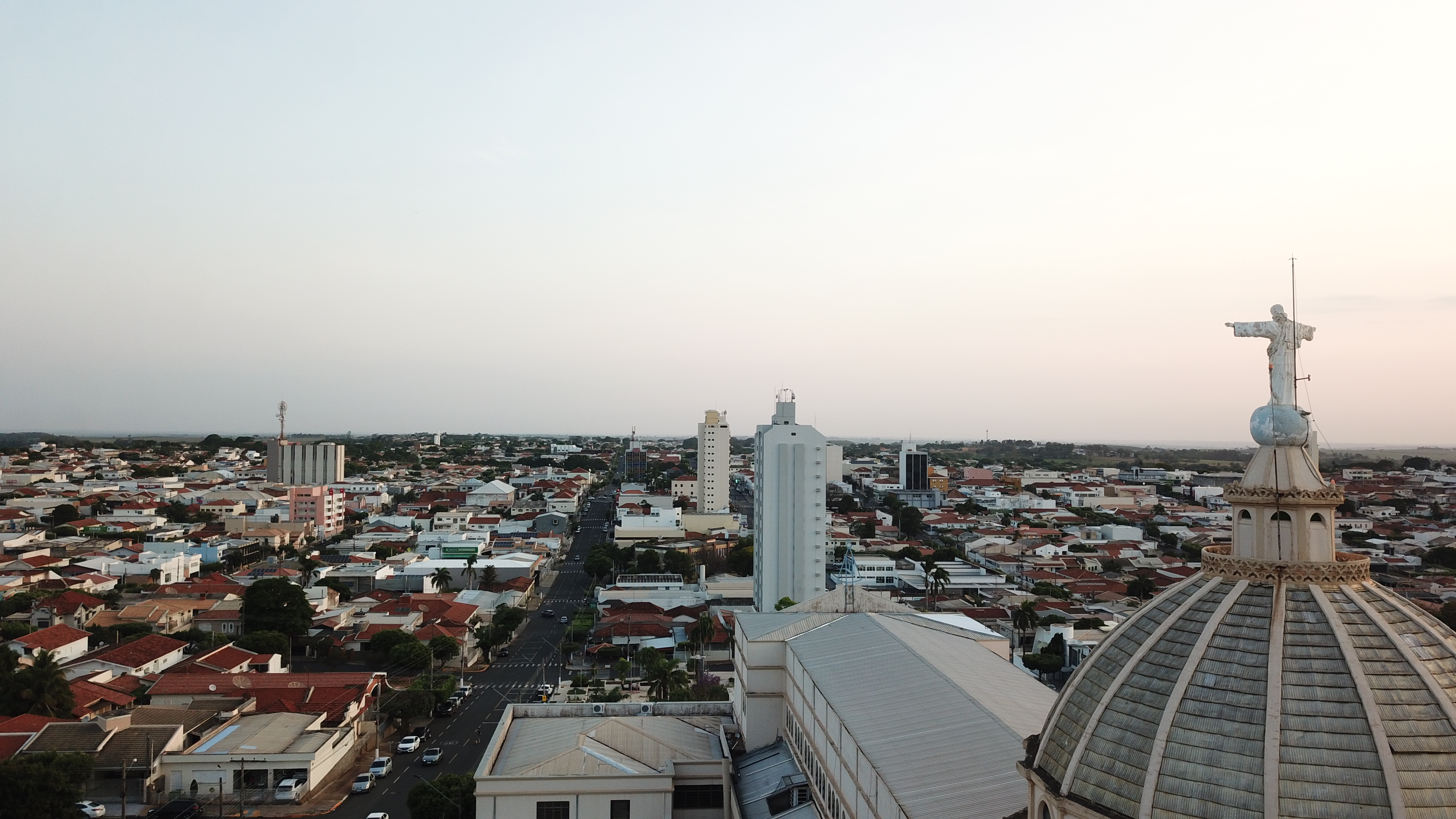
View of the city of Dracena with the telephone exchange to the left.

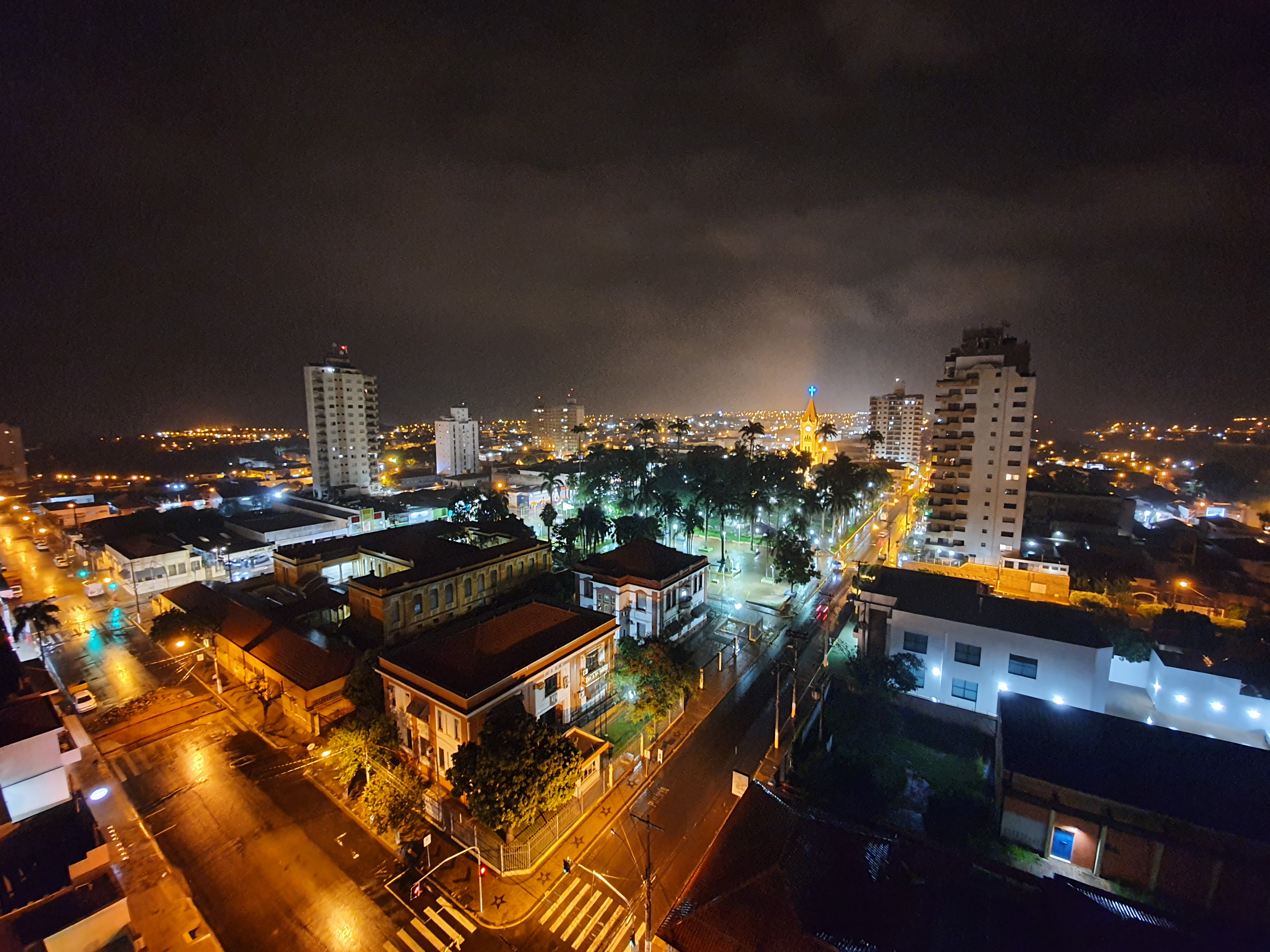
Night view of the city of Monte Alto with the telephone exchange to the right.

• Adamantina, Águas de Lindóia, Americana, Assis, Auriflama, Bariri, Barra Bonita, Birigui, Cafelândia, Catanduva, Colina, Cosmópolis, Cravinhos, Cunha, Descalvado, Dracena, Duartina, Espírito Santo do Pinhal, Estrela d'Oeste, Guararapes, Guariba, Ibitinga, Icém, Igaraçu do Tietê, Ipaussu, Itapetininga (outgoing), Itapira, Itápolis, Jaú, Junqueirópolis, Lins, Mococa, Monte Alto, Novo Horizonte, Ourinhos, Panorama, Paraibuna, Pedreira, Pindamonhangaba, Piraju, Pirajuí, Pirassununga, Pompéia, Porto Ferreira, Promissão, Registro, Rubião Júnior, Santa Cruz do Rio Pardo, Santa Rita do Passa Quatro, São Simão, Sumaré, Taquarituba, Tatuí (outgoing), Tupã, Valinhos, Valparaíso, Vera Cruz, Vinhedo In 1979 the following localities entered DDD:

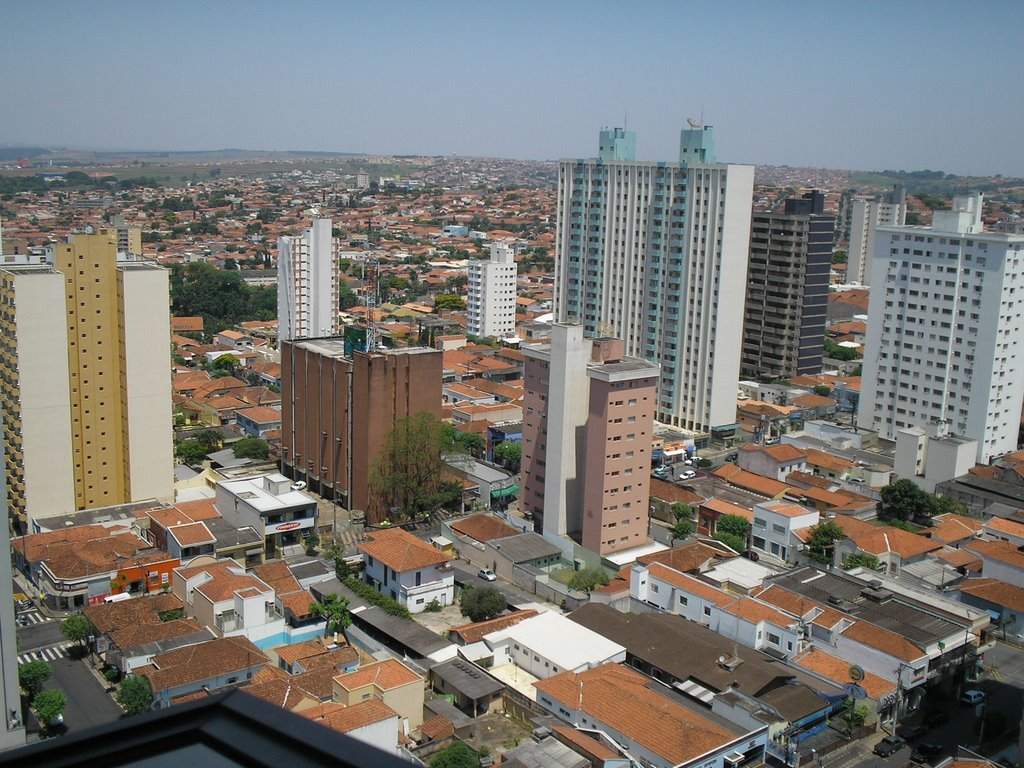
View of the city of Limeira with the telephone exchange to the left.

- Aguaí, Águas de São Pedro, Américo Brasiliense, Angatuba, Aparecida, Araçoiaba da Serra, Bernardino de Campos, Bertioga, Bocaina, Boqueirão, Buritama, Cândido Mota, Capão Bonito, Capivari, Cerquilho, Cidade Ocian, Conchal, Fartura, Getulina, Holambra II, Hortolândia, Iacanga, Ibiúna, Itaí, Itanhaém, Itapeva (outgoing), Itararé, Jurumirim, Laranjal Paulista, Leme, Limeira, Louveira, Lucélia, Mogi Guaçu, Mongaguá, Monte Azul Paulista, Moreira César, Nova Odessa, Nova Veneza, Osvaldo Cruz, Palmeira d'Oeste, Palmital, Paraguaçu Paulista, Peruíbe, Piedade, Pirapozinho, Pitangueiras, Pontal, Porto Feliz, Praia do Lázaro, Presidente Epitácio, Ribeirão Bonito, Salto de Pirapora, Santa Bárbara d'Oeste, Santa Branca, Santa Rosa de Viterbo, São José do Rio Pardo, São Pedro, Socorro, Solemar, Teodoro Sampaio, Tietê, Tupi Paulista, Vila Caiçara, Votorantim (outgoing)
- incoming DDD: Ariranha, Capela do Alto, Ibirá, Itariri, Pedro de Toledo, Santa Lúcia, Tapiraí

In that year, 200 of the 203 cities integrated into DDD were also already integrated into DDI. From then on, all cities integrated into the DDD system were simultaneously integrated into the DDI system.

In 1980 the following localities entered DDD/DDI:

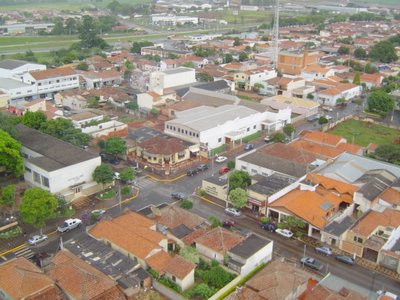
View of the city of Cordeirópolis with the telephone exchange to the right.

- Apiaí, Bastos, Brotas, Conchas, Cordeirópolis, Igarapava, Iracemápolis, Itajobi, Jaguariúna, Mineiros do Tietê, Monte Alegre do Sul, Monte Mor, Nova Europa, Pedregulho, Pirangi, Praia Grande, Rio das Pedras, Santa Adélia, São Bento do Sapucaí, São Carlos, Tabatinga, Tambaú
- incoming DDD: Barão de Antonina, Boituva, Buri, Cananéia, Eldorado, Iguape, Itaberá, Jacupiranga, Miracatu, Ribeirão Branco, Rincão, Riversul
- In addition, Ribeirão Bonito, which was already in DDD, was integrated into DDI

In 1981, the following localities entered DDD/DDI:

- Álvares Machado, Artur Nogueira, Boa Esperança do Sul, Caconde, Cananéia (outgoing), Castilho, Chavantes, Dourado, Echaporã, Elias Fausto, Gália, Ibaté, Iguape (outgoing), Irapuru, Itapuí, Itirapina, Macatuba, Massaguaçu, Miracatu (outgoing), Mirante do Paranapanema, Nova Granada, Pacaembu, Parapuã, Paulo de Faria, Piratininga, Quatá, Regente Feijó, Rinópolis, Santa Albertina, Santa Cruz das Palmeiras, Santa Fé do Sul, Santo Antônio de Posse, São Francisco da Praia (outgoing), São Sebastião da Grama, Serrana, Urânia, Urupês, Vargem Grande do Sul
- incoming DDD: Anhembi, Areiópolis, Guapiara, Iperó, Irapuã, Pariquera-Açu, Sete Barras

In 1982, the following localities entered DDD/DDI:

- Águas de Santa Bárbara, Analândia, Boituva (outgoing), Borborema, Cajati, Carapiranga (rural), Casa Branca, Cedral, Cerqueira César, Charqueada, Divinolândia, Dumont, Flórida Paulista, General Salgado, Guapiaçu, Ibirá (outgoing), Icém (DDI), Iepê, Iperó (outgoing), Itaberá (outgoing), Juquiá, Lindóia, Maracaí, Mirassol, Neves Paulista, Paranapanema, Patrocínio Paulista, Pilar do Sul, Pindorama, Poloni, Porto Primavera, Potirendaba, Pradópolis, Praia da Lagoinha, Presidente Bernardes, Riolândia, Roseira, Saltinho, Salto Grande, Santa Gertrudes, São Luís do Paraitinga, São Miguel Arcanjo, Tabapuã, Valparaíso (DDI), Vila Engenheiro Coelho, Viradouro
- incoming DDD: Dobrada, Iporanga, Palmares Paulista, Ribeira, Sales, Taiaçu, Vista Alegre do Alto

In 1983, the following localities entered DDD/DDI:

- Barrinha, Buri (outgoing), Eldorado (outgoing), Itaporanga, Itariri (outgoing), Jacupiranga (outgoing), Pedro de Toledo (outgoing), Rafard, Rincão (outgoing), Taiúva
- incoming DDD: Arandu, Bofete, Coronel Macedo, Guareí, Pardinho, Sarapuí

In 1984, the following localities entered DDD/DDI:

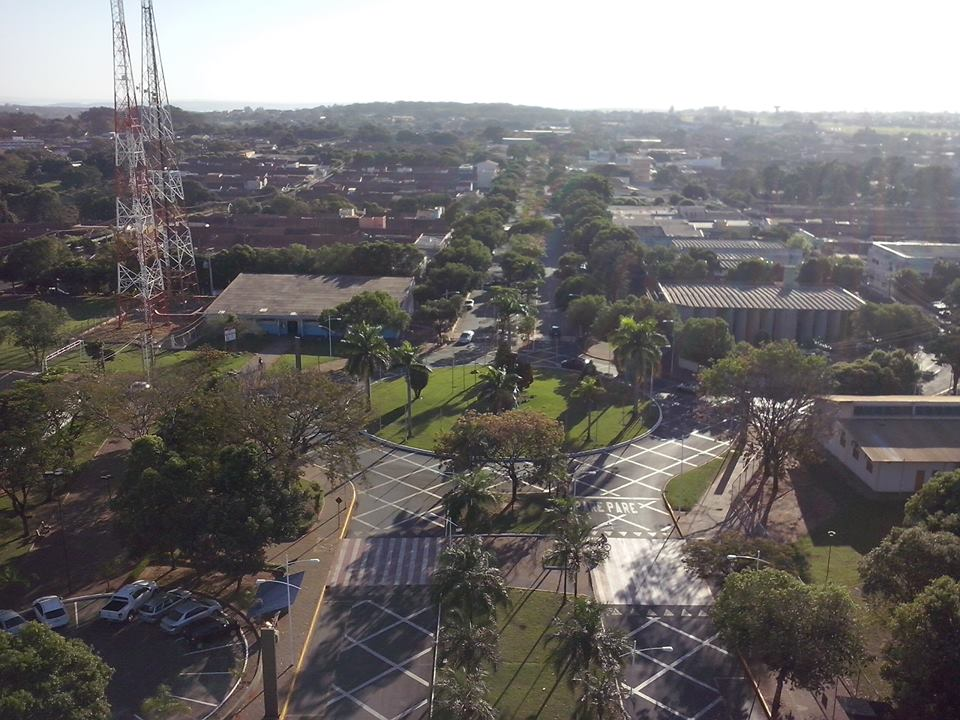
View of the city of Ilha Solteira with the telephone exchange to the left.

- Catiguá, Ilha Solteira, Pariquera-Açu (outgoing), Piquerobi, Praia do Juqueí

In 1985, the following localities entered DDD/DDI:

- Adolfo, Altair, Avanhandava, Bady Bassitt, Bálsamo, Braúna, Cesário Lange, Clementina, Guaraçaí, Guaraci, Ibirarema, Itatinga, Jaborandi, Jeriquara, Macaubal, Orindiúva, Palestina, Paraíso, São José da Bela Vista, Severínia, Taguaí, Terra Roxa, Torrinha, Uchoa

In 1986, the 40 municipalities below were integrated into the DDD/DDI system, which by the end of the year totaled 392:

- Américo de Campos, Aparecida d'Oeste, Bananal, Bilac, Coroados, Cosmorama, Cristais Paulista, Floreal, Glicério, Guaiçara, Guaimbê, Herculândia, Indiaporã, Inúbia Paulista, Itirapuã, Luiziânia, Mariápolis, Mendonça, Mombuca, Nova Aliança, Nova Guataporanga, Oriente, Oscar Bressane, Ouro Verde, Paranapuã, Paulicéia, Piacatu, Planalto, Pontes Gestal, Populina, Queiroz, Queluz, Quintana, Sabino, Santa Mercedes, Santópolis do Aguapeí, São João do Pau d'Alho, São Pedro do Turvo, Serra Azul, Três Fronteiras

In 1987, 10 more municipalities were integrated into the DDD/DDI system, listed below, raising the total to 402, thus representing 76% of the 531 municipalities in the state operated by TELESP:

- Alfredo Marcondes, Areias, Bento de Abreu, Gastão Vidigal, Lagoinha, Lavrinhas, Monte Castelo, São José do Barreiro, Silveiras, Tapiratiba

In 1988, the DDD/DDI system was extended to 80 more municipalities, listed below, raising the total to 482 municipalities, or 90.6% of the 532 municipalities served by the company:

- Alto Alegre, Alvinlândia, Anhembi (outgoing), Arealva, Areiópolis (outgoing), Ariranha (outgoing), Avaí, Barra do Turvo, Boraceia, Cabrália Paulista, Caiabu, Caiuá, Cajobi, Campos Novos Paulista, Cândido Rodrigues, Capela do Alto (outgoing), Corumbataí, Cruzália, Estrela do Norte, Fernando Prestes, Flora Rica, Gabriel Monteiro, Guarani d'Oeste, Guareí (outgoing), Iacri, Indiana, Ipeúna, Iporanga (outgoing), Itaju, Itapura, Itobi, Jaci, Jales, Jambeiro, João Ramalho, Júlio Mesquita, Lucianópolis, Lupércio, Manduri, Marabá Paulista, Mirassolândia, Monteiro Lobato, Narandiba, Natividade da Serra, Nipoã, Ocauçu, Onda Verde, Palmares Paulista (outgoing), Pardinho (outgoing), Pereiras, Pongaí, Presidente Alves, Redenção da Serra, Reginópolis, Restinga, Ribeirão Branco (outgoing), Ribeirão do Sul, Rubinéia, Sagres, Sales (outgoing), Salmourão, Sandovalina, Santa Clara d'Oeste, Santa Cruz da Conceição, Santa Ernestina, Santa Maria da Serra, Santa Rita d'Oeste, Santana da Ponte Pensa, Santo Antônio do Jardim, Santo Antônio do Pinhal, Santo Expedito, Sarutaiá, Sete Barras (outgoing), Taciba, Taiaçu (outgoing), Tarabai, Timburi, Turiúba, Ubirajara

During 1989, the last 50 municipalities – of the 532 operated by TELESP – that still did not have this service were integrated into the DDD/DDI system:

- Álvares Florence, Álvaro de Carvalho, Anhumas, Arandu (outgoing), Balbinos, Barão de Antonina (outgoing), Barbosa, Bofete (outgoing), Borá, Coronel Macedo (outgoing), Dobrada (outgoing), Dolcinópolis, Florínea, Guapiara (outgoing), Guarantã, Guzolândia, Irapuã (outgoing), Lavínia, Luís Antônio, Lutécia, Macedônia, Magda, Marinópolis, Meridiano, Mira Estrela, Monções, Murutinga do Sul, Nova Independência, Nova Luzitânia, Óleo, Pedranópolis, Platina, Porangaba, Ribeira (outgoing), Rifaina, Riversul (outgoing), Rubiácea, Santa Lúcia (outgoing), São Francisco, São João das Duas Pontes, Sarapuí (outgoing), Sebastianópolis do Sul, Sud Mennucci, Tapiraí (outgoing), Tejupá, Turmalina, União Paulista, Uru, Valentim Gentil, Vista Alegre do Alto (outgoing)

DDD/IDD implementation (number of cities per year)
Year	DDD entry	DDD exit	DDD completion	Total DDD	IDD	Total IDD
1969	1	-	-	-	-	-
1970	-	1	-	1	-	-
1971	3	-	-	1	-	-
1972	-	-	1	2	-	-
1973	-	1	8	11	-	-
1974	4	2	4	17	-	-
1975	7	1	9	26	-	-
1976	-	1	16	42	21	21
1977	-	3	34	80	43	64
1978	-	4	63	148	72	136
1979 (Note: Including Jacareí, Salesópolis and Santa Branca, municipalities reincorporated by Telesp in 1979)	5	2	54	203	64	200
1980	14	1	23	228	26	226
1981	6	3	39	270	42	268
1982	8	4	38	312	44	312
1983 (Note: Including Vargem Grande Paulista, municipality created in 1983)	6	6	6	324	12	324
1984	-	1	3	328	4	328
1985	-	-	24	352	24	352
1986	-	-	40	392	40	392
1987	-	-	10	402	10	402
1988 (Note: Including Jales, municipality incorporated by Telesp in 1987)	-	12	68	482	80	482
1989	-	13	37	532	50	532

Implementation of the complete DDD system by tertiary area (number of cities per year)
Tertiary area	71	72	73	74	75	76	77	78	79	80	81	82	83	84	85	86	87	88	89
11–São Paulo	1		1		1														
11–Cotia					1	2	4	3		1	2	1	1						
11–Jundiaí						4		5		1	4	3	1	1				1	
122–Taubaté			1	2	1			1				2					1	3	
123–São José dos Campos			1				2	1	1	1								2	
124–Caraguatatuba						4													
125–Guaratinguetá					2		3	1	1							2	4		
132–Santos			1	3					4				2						
138–Registro								1			3	1	2	1				1	
142–Bauru			1		1		2	2	1		3							8	3
143–Ourinhos								4	2		1	1			2	1		4	2
144–Marília			1		1			3		1						5		7	1
145–Lins								3	1							3			
146–Jaú							1	4	1	2	1				1			1	
147–Avaré				1				1	1			3							2
149–Botucatu			2							1				1			4	1	
152–Sorocaba			1					2	10			4			1			2	3
155–Itapeva									3	1		1	2					3	4
162–Araraquara					1	1	1	2	2	3	3	1	1					3	2
163–Jaboticabal						1		2					1					1	1
166–Ribeirão Preto							1	2	3		1	2	1			1			1
167–Franca										2		1			2	2		1	1
172–São José do Rio Preto						1	4	1			2	7			9	2		4	1
173–Barretos						1	1	1	1	1		1			2				
174–Votuporanga							4	2				1			1	5	1	1	11
175–Catanduva								2		2	1	3		1	1			4	1
176–Jales									2		3					4		4	5
182–Presidente Prudente		1					4		3		3	2		1			1	11	1
183–Assis								1	3		2	1						1	4
186–Araçatuba							2	3	1						3	7	1	3	3
187–Andradina							3				1				1			1	3
188–Dracena								3	1		2					5	1	1	
189–Adamantina								1	2		2	1				2		2	
192–Campinas					1	1	4	7	4	3	3	1							
194–Piracicaba					1			1	6	2		1	1			1		1	
195–Rio Claro					1		1	4	1	1	1	2						3	
196–São João da Boa Vista						2		2	2	1	4	2					1	2	

Several districts that became emancipated in the 1990s were integrated into the DDD system with their own exchanges, such as São Lourenço da Serra (1977), Holambra (1978), Bertioga and Hortolândia (1979), Cajati, Engenheiro Coelho and Saltinho (1982), Ilha Solteira (1984), Ilha Comprida, Pratânia, Jumirim and Gavião Peixoto (1985), Pedrinhas Paulista (1988), Novais (1991), etc.

Cities that shared the telephone exchange of a nearby city for technical convenience were integrated into DDD before having their own exchanges, as were districts that shared the exchange of the municipal seat, several of them through PABX, such as Alumínio, Arco-Íris, Canitar, Suzanápolis, Trabiju, etc.

Some of these districts that later became municipalities were served only by "vilafones", being integrated later into the DDD system, such as Barra do Chapéu, Bom Sucesso de Itararé, Itaoca, Itapirapuã Paulista, and Nova Campina.

=== Change of area codes ===
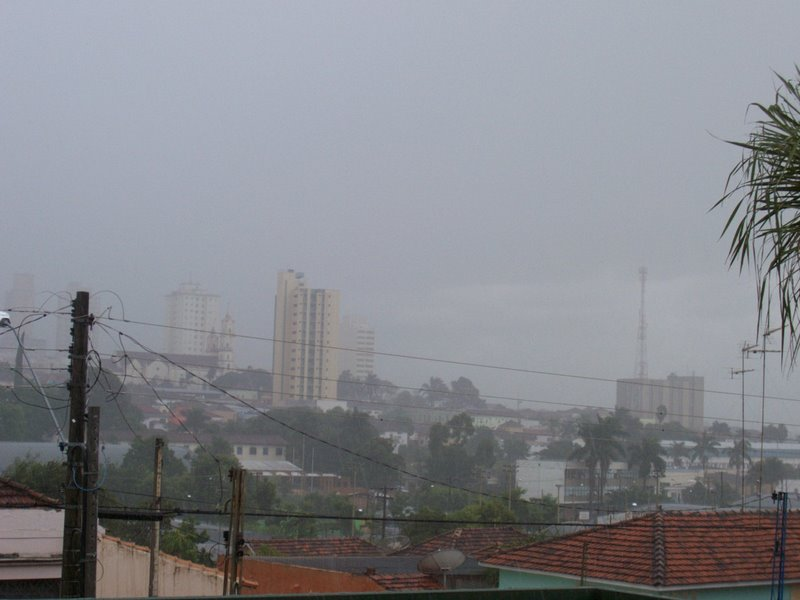
View of the city of Lins with the telephone exchange on the right.

In 1995 and 1996, the area codes (DDD) were changed from four to three digits:

- Apr 1995: part of (0132) to (013)
- May 1995–Jul 1995: part of (0192) to (019)
- Jun 1995: part of (0132) to (013) and (0189) to (018)
- Aug 1995: (0138) to (013) and (0186, 0187, 0188) to (018)
- Sep 1995: (0146) to (014) and (0162, 0163) to (016)
- Oct 1995: (0149) to (014) and (0172, 0173, 0175) to (017)
- Feb 1996: (0125) to (012)
- Mar 1996: (0122) to (012) and part of (0192) to (019)
- Apr 1996: (0124) to (012) and (0174, 0176) to (017)
- May 1996: (0123) to (012), (0143, 0144, 0145) to (014) and part of (0152) to (015)
- Jul 1996: part of (0152) to (015), (0182, 0183) to (018) and (0195, 0196) to (019)
- Aug 1996: (0194) to (019)
- Sep 1996: (0142, 0147) to (014)
- Oct 1996: (0155) to (015)

After the change of the DDD codes, the tertiary numbering areas ceased to exist, but for the long-distance calling system the tariff areas remain in force to this day, according to Resolution No. 424 of 6 December 2005 of the Anatel.

== Interiorization of television signals ==
To comply with the expansion of TV signals to the interior contained in Ordinance 725 of the Ministry of Communications, Telesp prepared its microwave transmission system for this purpose.

In 1980, Telesp began contracting equipment for the state of São Paulo for the retransmission of TV signals via microwave link on the following routes:

- São Paulo – Japi – Campinas
- São Paulo – Cabreúva – Campinas
- Campinas – Araraquara
- Araraquara – Avaré
- Araraquara – São José do Rio Preto
- São José do Rio Preto – Santa Fé do Sul
- São José do Rio Preto – Araçatuba
- Araçatuba – Andradina
- Araçatuba – Presidente Prudente
- Presidente Prudente – Assis
- Mirante da Lajinha (São João da Boa Vista) – Ribeirão Preto

In February 1981 an agreement was signed between the Government of the state of São Paulo and the Ministry of Communications, with Telesp acting as intermediary, for the interior distribution of television from the Fundação Padre Anchieta - Centro Paulista de Rádio e Televisão Educativas (RTC - Rádio e Televisão Cultura - Channel 2), with Telesp providing the TV signal in 26 locations for RTC to distribute.

In July 1981 a contract was also signed between Telesp and the Rádio e Televisão Bandeirantes (TV Bandeirantes - Channel 13), for the interior distribution of its TV signals, with Telesp delivering the TV signal in 6 locations from which TV Bandeirantes carried out its distribution. Thus, 212 localities were served by TV signal through Telesp's transmission system.

In 1982, using Telesp's microwave routes, the two television broadcasters transmitted TV signals through 36 relay stations to 501 municipalities.

== End of the company ==
After the controversial privatization process in July 1998, Telesp was acquired by the Spanish company Telefónica, forming Telefônica Brasil, which in 2012 adopted the Vivo brand for its fixed-line telephony operations.

== See also ==
- Companhia Telefônica Brasileira (CTB)
- Companhia de Telecomunicações do Estado de São Paulo (COTESP)
- Companhia Telefônica da Borda do Campo (CTBC)
- Centrais Telefônicas de Ribeirão Preto (CETERP)
- Telephone exchanges in the city of São Paulo
- List of municipalities of São Paulo by area code
