= Mesoregion of Assis =

Coordinates: 22.6619°S 50.4119°W

- Mesoregion
- Location of the Mesoregion of Assis
- Country: Brazil
- Region: Southeast
- State: São Paulo

Area
  - Total: 12,710.210 km^{2} (4,907.440 sq mi)

Population (2010/IBGE)
  - Total: 553.778
  - Density: 44.1/km^{2} (114/sq mi)
- Estimative
- Time zone: UTC-3 (UTC-3)
  - Summer (DST): UTC-2 (UTC-2)
- Area codes: +55 18 at Assis's Microregion and +55 14 at Microregion of Ourinhos

The Mesoregion of Assis (or Paranapanema Valley's Mesoregion) is one of the 15 mesoregions of the São Paulo state, Brazil. It is located at the southwest portion of the state, and has an area of 12,710.210 km^{2} and the seat of mesoregion is in Assis.

The population of the mesoregion is 567,858 inhabitants (IBGE/2010), spread over 35 municipalities.

The boundaries of Paranapanema Valley Region is Itapetininga's Mesoregion (at east), Presidente Prudente's Mesoregion (at west), Marília's Mesoregion and Bauru's Mesoregion (north), Mesoregion of Pioneer North of Paraná and Mesoregion of North Central of Paraná (at South). The GDP is R$10.949.020,00 and the region is an important and strategic way to access the South of Brasil and Mercosul. The principal resource of Paranapanema Valley economy is Sugarcane, Agribusiness, Electronics, Software, Products chemical, Food, mechanical and others.

The microregions have a huge integration with cities. Actually, Ourinhos is the most populated city in region, followed by Assis, Paraguaçu Paulista and Santa Cruz do Rio Pardo, they have populations of more than 40,000. The limits of the region with Paraná state is Paranapanema River. The region was unoccupied until the twentieth century, when the first villages were created, but only with arrival of the railroad (Estrada de Ferro Sorocabana, Sorocabana Railway) the region developed. Over the years, the city began to receive public services like education, health, water and electricity. The main road in the region is the Raposo Tavares Highway that cuts through the middle region, connecting the state capital to the city of Presidente Prudente.

Because the connection history, especially in Microregion of Ourinhos, there is a great influence on Pioneer North of Paraná, mainly in the cities of Jacarezinho, Santo Antonio da Platina and Cambará. Meanwhile, in the Microregion of Assis, the connection with the Paraná is greatly reduced and the integration is mainly among the municipalities in the region, mainly Tarumã, Cândido Mota, Palmital and Paraguaçu Paulista. For better integration of the cities, there are as CIVAP intermunicipal arrangements (Intermunicipal Consortium of Paranapanema Valley) and UMMES (Union of Municipalities of the Middle Sorocabana) aimed at sharing common interests for development.

In addition, the region is well served by secondary technical schools (such as Etecs maintained by State Technological Education Center Paula Souza, Centro Estadual de Educação Tecnológica Paula Souza), colleges (such as Integrated College Ourinhos, Faculdades Integradas de Ourinhos), institutes (such as the Federal Institute of São Paulo at Assis), universities (like the State University Paulista with campuses at Assis and Ourinhos). Highlighting the UNESP (Assis and Ourinhos), Fatec of Ourinhos and the FEMA (Assis Educational Foundation) at Assis.

== Municipalities ==
All data from IBGE/2010

=== Microregion of Assis ===
- Population: 263.861
- Area (km^{2}): 7,141.738
- Population density (km^{2}): 37.2

Cities: Assis, Borá, Campos Novos, Cândido Mota, Cruzália, Florínia, Ibirarema, Iepê, Lutécia, Maracaí, Nantes, Palmital, Paraguaçu Paulista, Pedrinhas Paulista, Platina, Quatá, Tarumã

=== Microregion of Ourinhos ===
- Population: 289.917
- Area (km^{2}): 5,568.472
- Population density (km^{2}): 53.0

Cities: Bernardino de Campos, Canitar, Chavantes, Espírito Santo do Turvo, Fartura, Ipaussu, Manduri, Óleo, Ourinhos, Piraju, Ribeirão do Sul, Salto Grande, Santa Cruz do Rio Pardo, São Pedro do Turvo, Sarutaiá, Taguaí, Tejupá, Timburi

== Most populous cities in Mesoregion of Assis ==
- Most populous cities in Mesoregion of Assis - Instituto Brasileiro de Geografia e Estatística - Estimative (2014)
	#	City	Microregion	Pop.	#	City	Microregion	Pop.	
1	Ourinhos	Ourinhos	109 489	11	Ipaussu	Ourinhos	14 483
2	Assis	Assis	100 911	12	Quatá	Assis	13 603
3	Santa Cruz do Rio Pardo	Ourinhos	46 366	13	Chavantes	Ourinhos	12 482
4	Paraguaçu Paulista	Assis	44.310	14	Taguaí	Ourinhos	12 314
5	Cândido Mota	Assis	31 063	15	Bernardino de Campos	Ourinhos	11 146
6	Piraju	Ourinhos	29 599	16	Manduri	Ourinhos	9 529
7	Palmital	Assis	22 041	17	Salto Grande	Ourinhos	9 190
8	Fartura	Ourinhos	15 925	18	Iepê	Assis	8 002
9	Tarumã	Assis	14 027	19	São Pedro do Turvo	Ourinhos	7 538
10	Maracaí	Assis	13 878	20	Tejupá	Ourinhos	4 788

== See also ==
- Interior of São Paulo
