= Microregion of Assis =

Coordinates: 22.6619°S 50.4119°W

- Microregion
- Location of the Microregion of Assis
- Country: Brazil
- Region: Southeast
- State: São Paulo
- Mesoregion: Assis

Area
  - Total: 7,141,738 km^{2} (2,757,440 sq mi)

Population (2014/IBGE)
  - Total: 278,220
  - Density: 0.038957/km^{2} (0.10090/sq mi)
- Estimative
- Time zone: UTC-3 (UTC-3)
  - Summer (DST): UTC-2 (UTC-2)
- Area code: +55 18

The Microregion of Assis (Portuguese: Microrregião de Assis) is located on the west of São Paulo state, Brazil, is made up of 17 municipalities, and belongs to the Mesoregion of Assis.

The Microregion of Assis extends over an area of 7,141,738 km² with a population of 278,220.

== Municipalities ==
The microregion consists of the following municipalities, listed below with their 2014 Census populations (IBGE/2014):

- Assis 100,911
- Paraguaçu Paulista 44,555
- Cândido Mota 31,063
- Palmital 22,041
- Tarumã 14,027
- Maracaí 13,878
- Quatá 13,603
- Iepê 8,002
- Ibirarema 7,290
- Campos Novos Paulista 4,808
- Platina 3,406
- Pedrinhas Paulista 3,062
- Nantes 2,943
- Florínea 2,821
- Lutécia 2,741
- Cruzália 2,234
- Borá 835
