= Assis =

- Municipality
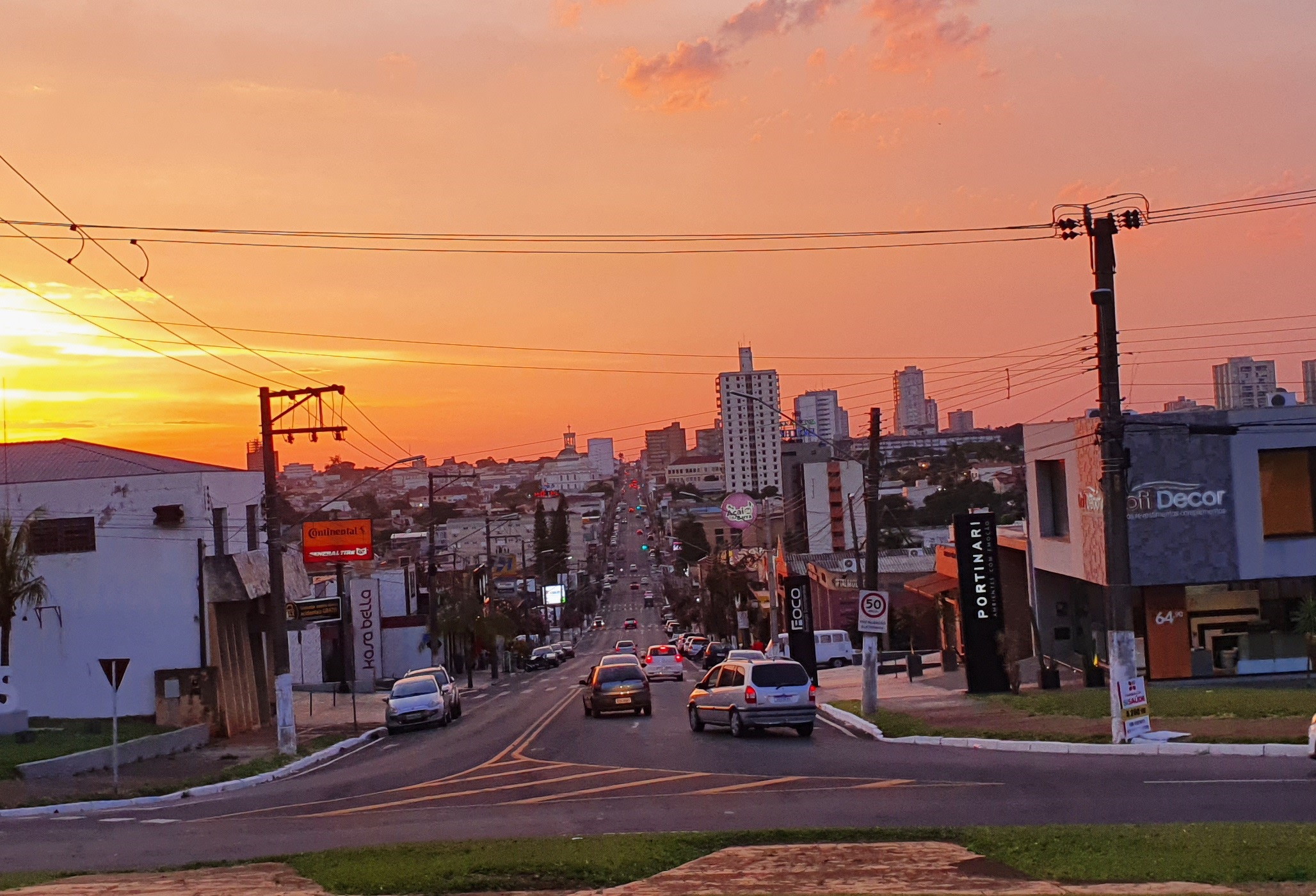
- Assis skyline at Rui Barbosa Avenue

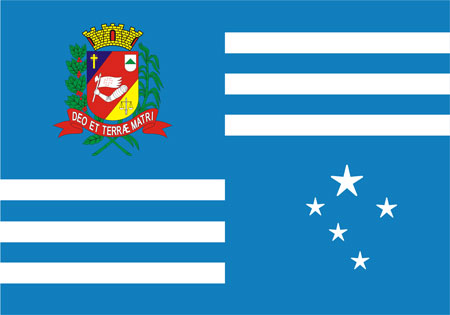
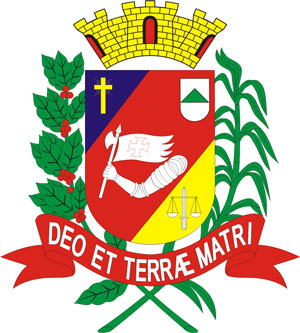
- Flag Coat of arms

- Location in São Paulo state

- Location in Brazil
- Coordinates: 22°39′43″S 50°24′43″W
- Country: Brazil
- Region: Southeast
- State: São Paulo
- Mesoregion: Assis
- Microregion: Assis

Government
  - Mayor: Telma Spera (PL) (2025-2028)

Area
  - Total: 460.61 km^{2} (177.84 sq mi)
- Elevation: 543 m (1,781 ft)

Population (2022 Census)
  - Total: 101,409
  - Estimate (2025): 104,858
  - Density: 220.16/km^{2} (570.22/sq mi)
- Time zone: UTC-03:00 (BRT)
  - Summer (DST): UTC-02:00 (BRST)
- Postal code: 19800-000
- Area code: 18
- Website: www.assis.sp.gov.br

Assis is a city and a municipality in the southwestern part of the state of São Paulo in Brazil. The population is 101,409 (2022 Census) in an area of 460.61 km^{2}. The town was founded on July 5, 1905, and became a municipality in 1917, when it was separated from Platina. It is the largest city of its microregion, and the 2nd of its mesoregion, and is 434 km away from the capital, São Paulo. The town has an annual average temperature of 21,37 °C, annual rainfall 1,441 mm (56.7 in), and the vegetation predominates Mata Atlântica and Cerrado, is then a transition zone of vegetation. Its Human Development Index (HDI) is 0.805, considered high if compared to state and is in 28th place among Brazilian cities.

Historical population
Year	Pop.	±%
1920	13,047	—
1934	18,169	+39.3%
1940	23,703	+30.5%
1950	32,959	+39.0%
1960	42,666	+29.5%
1970	57,220	+34.1%
1980	67,357	+17.7%
1991	85,391	+26.8%
1992	77,066	−9.7%
1993	78,425	+1.8%
1994	79,609	+1.5%
1995	80,765	+1.5%
1997	84,758	+4.9%
1998	86,133	+1.6%
1999	87,505	+1.6%
2000	87,251	−0.3%
2001	88,535	+1.5%
2002	89,657	+1.3%
2003	90,774	+1.2%
2004	93,118	+2.6%
2005	94,415	+1.4%
2006	95,703	+1.4%
2007	92,965	−2.9%
2008	97,725	+5.1%
2009	98,715	+1.0%
2010	95,144	−3.6%
2012	96,333	+1.2%
2013	100,204	+4.0%
2014	100,911	+0.7%
2015	101,597	+0.7%
2020	105,087	+3.4%

The name Assis is a reference to Captain Assis, who explored the lands of the region. It is currently formed by the city of Assis, with its single district headquarters since Tarumã became a separate municipality in 1990.

The city is known for its title Fraternal City and the undergraduate courses from UNESP at Assis, FEMA (Municipal Assis Educational Foundation) and Unip (Universidade Paulista - Paulista University). In the city, there are many industries, schools, universities, large agricultural production, and strong commerce and services. The city is the seat of the Roman Catholic Diocese of Assis. Assis is one of the most important regions and has a privileged geographic location where there are different types of agriculture. Furthermore, the city is served by Marcelo Pires Halzhausen State Airport. Assis is cropped by the railroad old Estrada de Ferro Sorocabana and by numerous highways connecting the main cities of the region, the states of Mato Grosso do Sul and Paraná

Furthermore, the city is regional development reference, with influence in the cities of Assis's Microregion, a few municipalities in the Ourinhos's Microregion, Marília's Microregion and North of Paraná by his commerce, services, cultural services, sports, science and technology that make Assis that bears the title of Capital of Paranapanema, even with strong competition from larger centers such as Marilia, Presidente Prudente and Londrina.

== Administration and political ==
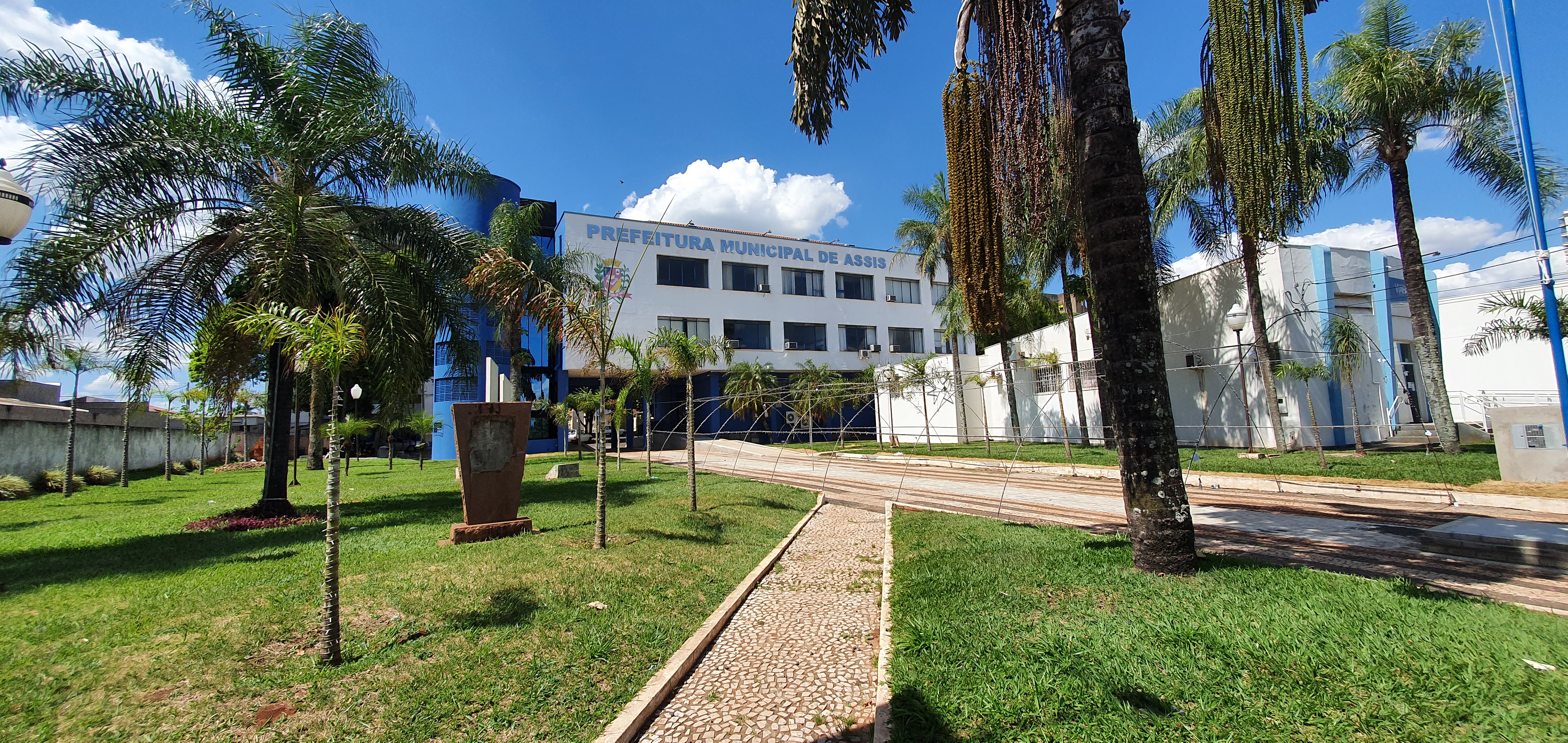
City Hall of Assis

Mayor: Ricardo Pinheiro (2013/2016)

Assis is seat of Government Region State and of CIVAP - Consórcio Intermunicipal do Vale Paranapanema (Intermunicipal Consortium of Paranapanema Valley) what is an alliance of 25 cities in Paranapanema Region with 300k inhabitants.

== Economy ==
Composition of Economy(2011)
Commerce and Services	80,44 %
Industrial	16,70 %
Agriculture	2,86 %

The economy of the city is diverse with strong commerce and services participation, but with huge state participation. In the city are many marketplaces. The city was growing in IT, in the city was a huge number of IT companies (98 companies of IT is operating in Assis).

== Education ==
Assis has a system of state and private primary and secondary schools and a variety of vocational-technical schools. It started in 1917 when Assis was transformed into a city. The first official and state school was Assis Isolated School (Escola Isolada de Assis), what was changed to Scholar Group of Assis (Grupo Escolar de Assis). After that, was created in 1941 the Assis Normal School (Escola Normal de Assis) with High School course and Normal course, that allowed the teacher formation.

In 1951 was created officially the Artesanal School of Assis (Escola Artesanal de Assis), that was changed into Industrial School of Assis, which nowadays is Assis's State Technical School "Pedro D'Arcádia Neto".

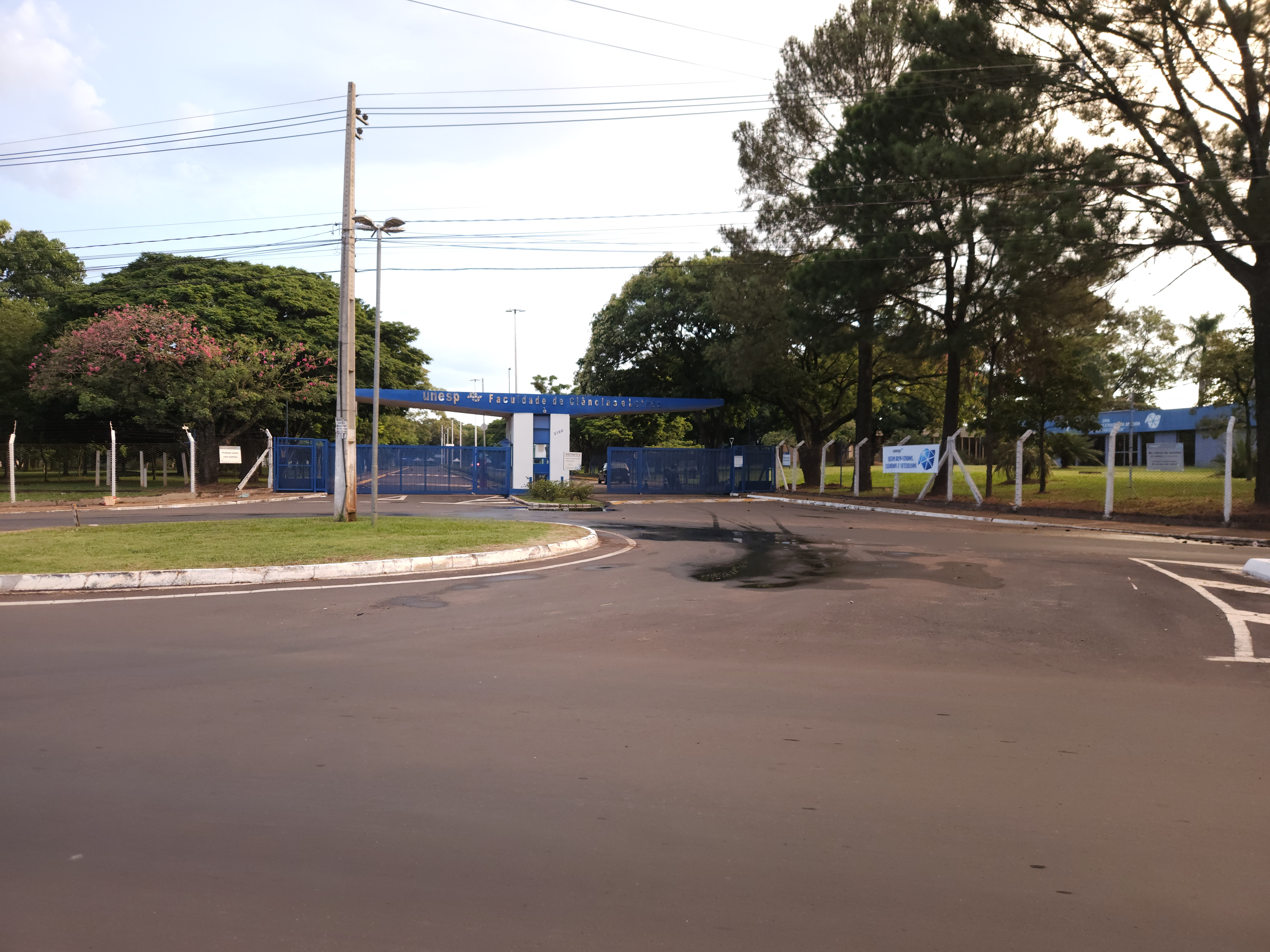
Hall of UNESP of Assis's campus

Furthermore, in 1956 the São Paulo State Legislature approved the Bill proposed by the House Representative Mr José Santilli Sobrinho, who created the Faculty of Philosophy, Sciences and Languages of Assis (Faculdade de Filosofia, Ciências e Letras de Assis) as an Institute for Higher Education. In 1959 was installed the course of Languages. Today the faculty is a part of multi-campus system of Universidade Estadual Paulista (Paulista State University) with name Faculty of Science and Languages of Assis (FCLA)

In the city are other universities like FEMA which was created by Assis's city hall (in other words, is a state university), but unlike Unesp the courses are not free and their students are required to pay tuition in all courses. "Histórico da FEMA" (PDF) (in Portuguese). Archived from the original (PDF) on 2014-05-31.

=== Educational institutions ===
The universities and colleges include:

- Universidade Estadual Paulista (Unesp), Paulista State University Júlio de Mesquita Filho;
- Faculdade de Tecnologia de São Paulo (Fatec), São Paulo Technological College;
- Fundação Educacional do Município de Assis (FEMA), Municipal Assis Educational Foundation;
- Universidade Paulista (Unip), Paulista University;
- Universidade Virtual do Estado de São Paulo (UNIVESP), Virtual University of the State of São Paulo;
- Universidade do Norte do Paraná (Unopar), Paraná Northern University;

== Health care ==
Assis has a large health care state and private system like Hospital Regional de Assis, the largest health care center of Mesoregion of Assis and reference in public health in this region. The city have a huge number of hospital around the city. Furthermore, the city has other hospitals like Santa Casa de Misericórdia de Assis and Hospital de Olhos Oeste Paulista (Hospital of Eyes of Paulista West), one of the best ophthalmological hospital in the country.

== Transportation ==
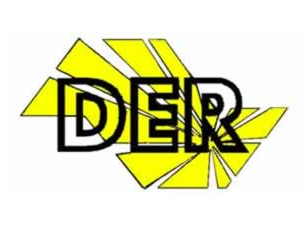
The city of Assis is the headquarters of the DR7

Assis is the headquarters of the Departamento de Estradas e Rodagens de São Paulo (Department of Roads of São Paulo), being the 7th Regional Division. It is responsible for managing state roads of Middle Paranapanema and part of the Marília's Mesoregion and Ourinhos's Microregion.

- Avenida/Rodovia Benedito Pires (Benedito Pires Highway/Avenue) - Connects Assis to Cândido Mota. Four-lane highway.
- SP-270 - Rodovia Raposo Tavares (Raposo Tavares Highway) - Connects Assis to Ourinhos, Presidente Prudente, São Paulo and others. From Ourinhos to Presidente Prudente is a freeway highway.
- SP-284 - Rodovia Manilo Gobbi (Manilo Gobbi Highway) - Connects Assis to Paraguaçu Paulista
- SP-333 - Rodovia Rachid Rayes (Rachid Rayes Highway) - Connects Assis to Marília and Bauru
- SP-333 - Rodovia Miguel Jubran (Miguel Jubran Highway) - Connects Assis to Tarumã, Florínia and Paraná State (old Assis - Londrina Highway). Assis to Tarumã is a freeway highway.

The city is served by Assis Airport.

== Media ==
In telecommunications, the city was served by Telecomunicações de São Paulo. In July 1998, this company was acquired by Telefónica, which adopted the Vivo brand in 2012. The company is currently an operator of cell phones, fixed lines, internet (fiber optics/4G) and television (satellite and cable).

== Climate ==
Climate data for Assis, elevation 551 m (1,808 ft), (1991–2020 normals, extremes 1991–2022)
Month	Jan	Feb	Mar	Apr	May	Jun	Jul	Aug	Sep	Oct	Nov	Dec	Year
Record high °C (°F)	37.3 (99.1)	37.0 (98.6)	36.6 (97.9)	38.0 (100.4)	32.6 (90.7)	30.8 (87.4)	34.8 (94.6)	37.1 (98.8)	39.6 (103.3)	42.5 (108.5)	38.7 (101.7)	37.2 (99.0)	42.5 (108.5)
Mean daily maximum °C (°F)	30.0 (86.0)	30.1 (86.2)	30.1 (86.2)	28.7 (83.7)	25.3 (77.5)	24.6 (76.3)	25.1 (77.2)	27.4 (81.3)	28.4 (83.1)	29.6 (85.3)	30.0 (86.0)	30.3 (86.5)	28.3 (82.9)
Daily mean °C (°F)	24.6 (76.3)	24.6 (76.3)	24.2 (75.6)	22.4 (72.3)	18.9 (66.0)	17.9 (64.2)	17.8 (64.0)	19.3 (66.7)	21.1 (70.0)	22.9 (73.2)	23.7 (74.7)	24.4 (75.9)	21.8 (71.3)
Mean daily minimum °C (°F)	19.2 (66.6)	19.1 (66.4)	18.3 (64.9)	16.0 (60.8)	12.5 (54.5)	11.2 (52.2)	10.4 (50.7)	11.2 (52.2)	13.8 (56.8)	16.3 (61.3)	17.3 (63.1)	18.6 (65.5)	15.3 (59.6)
Record low °C (°F)	11.2 (52.2)	12.2 (54.0)	11.8 (53.2)	3.6 (38.5)	2.2 (36.0)	−3.2 (26.2)	−3.0 (26.6)	−0.1 (31.8)	0.0 (32.0)	7.3 (45.1)	9.4 (48.9)	10.4 (50.7)	−3.2 (26.2)
Average precipitation mm (inches)	237.8 (9.36)	178.9 (7.04)	130.7 (5.15)	93.8 (3.69)	87.1 (3.43)	65.0 (2.56)	43.8 (1.72)	40.2 (1.58)	89.6 (3.53)	135.3 (5.33)	140.1 (5.52)	175.7 (6.92)	1,418 (55.83)
Average precipitation days (≥ 1.0 mm)	15.7	14.6	11.8	7.2	8.3	8.5	5.9	4.4	8.0	10.1	10.2	13.1	117.8
Source: Centro Integrado de Informações Agrometeorológicas

== Religion ==
Christianity is present in the city as follows:

=== Catholic Church ===
The Catholic church in the municipality is part of the Roman Catholic Diocese of Assis.

=== Protestant Church ===
The most diverse evangelical beliefs are present in the city, mainly Pentecostal, including the Assemblies of God in Brazil (the largest evangelical church in the country), Christian Congregation in Brazil, among others. These denominations are growing more and more throughout Brazil.

== See also ==
- List of municipalities in São Paulo
- Interior of São Paulo
