= Platina (disambiguation) =

Platina is a municipality in Brazil.

Platina may also refer to:

- Platina, a New Zealand Company sailing ship that arrived in Wellington, New Zealand in 1840 with 2 settlers
- Platina, California, an unincorporated community in the United States
- Piadena ("Platina" in Latin), an Italian village
- Bartolomeo Platina, a 15th-century author
- Nissan Platina, one alternative name of the Renault Clio
- Platina Records, a swedish independent record label.

== See also ==
- Platinum
