= SP-333 (São Paulo highway) =

State highway in São Paulo, Brazil

SP-333
- Rodovia Abrão Assed; Rodovia Carlos Tonanni; Rodovia Nemesio Cadetti; Rodovia Laurentino Mascari; Rodovia Mario Gentil; Rodovia Leonor Mendes de Barros; Rodovia Américo Augusto Pereira; Rodovia Leonor Mendes de Barros; Rodovia Rachid Rayes; Rodovia Miguel Jubran
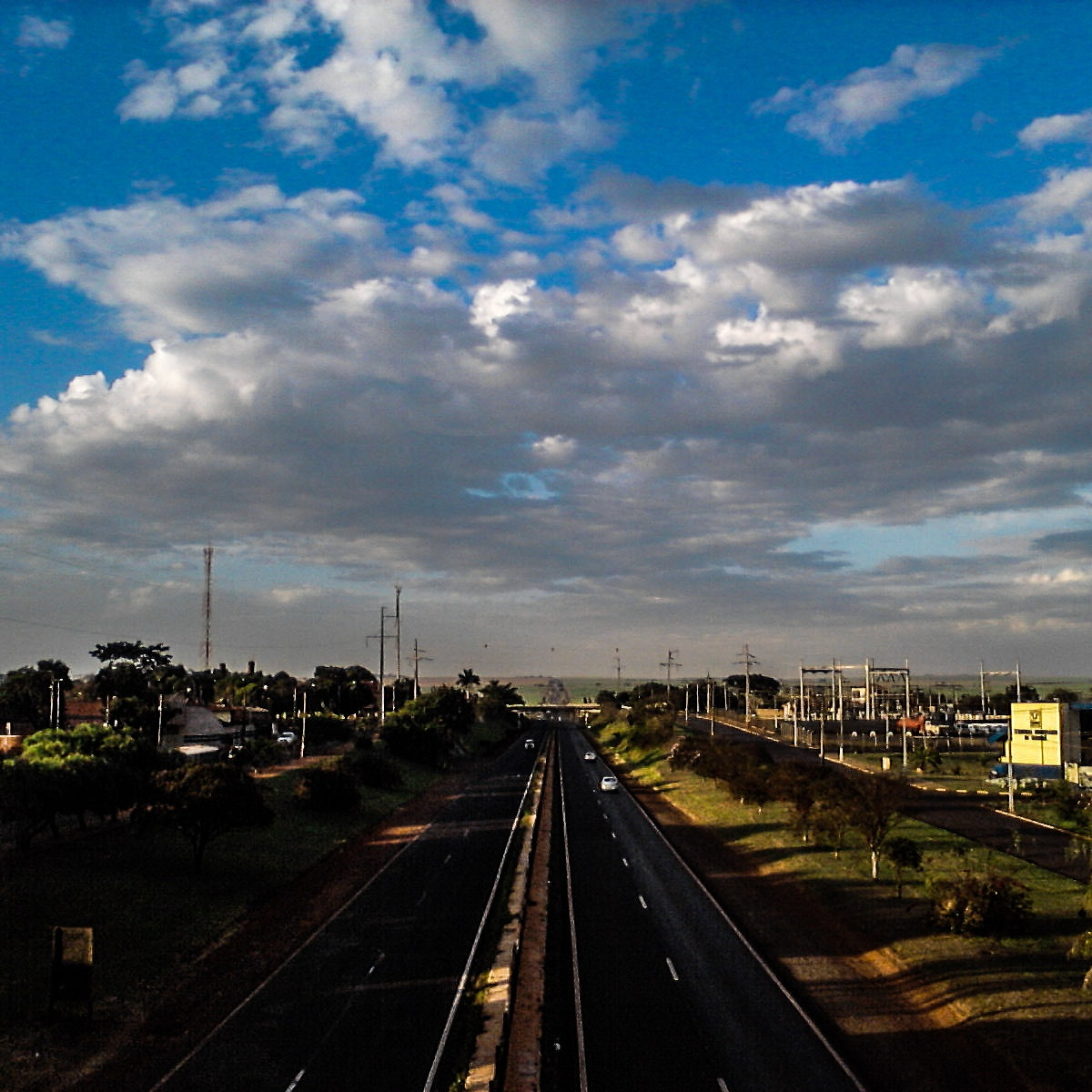
- View of the Highway

Route information
- Maintained by DER - SP and Triângulo do Sol
- Length: 450.990 km (280.232 mi)

Major junctions
- North end: Cajuru, São Paulo
- Southwest end: Porto Areias, Florinea, São Paulo/PR-323 - Sertaneja, Paraná

Location
- Country: Brazil
- State: São Paulo

Highway system
- Highways in Brazil; Federal; São Paulo State Highways

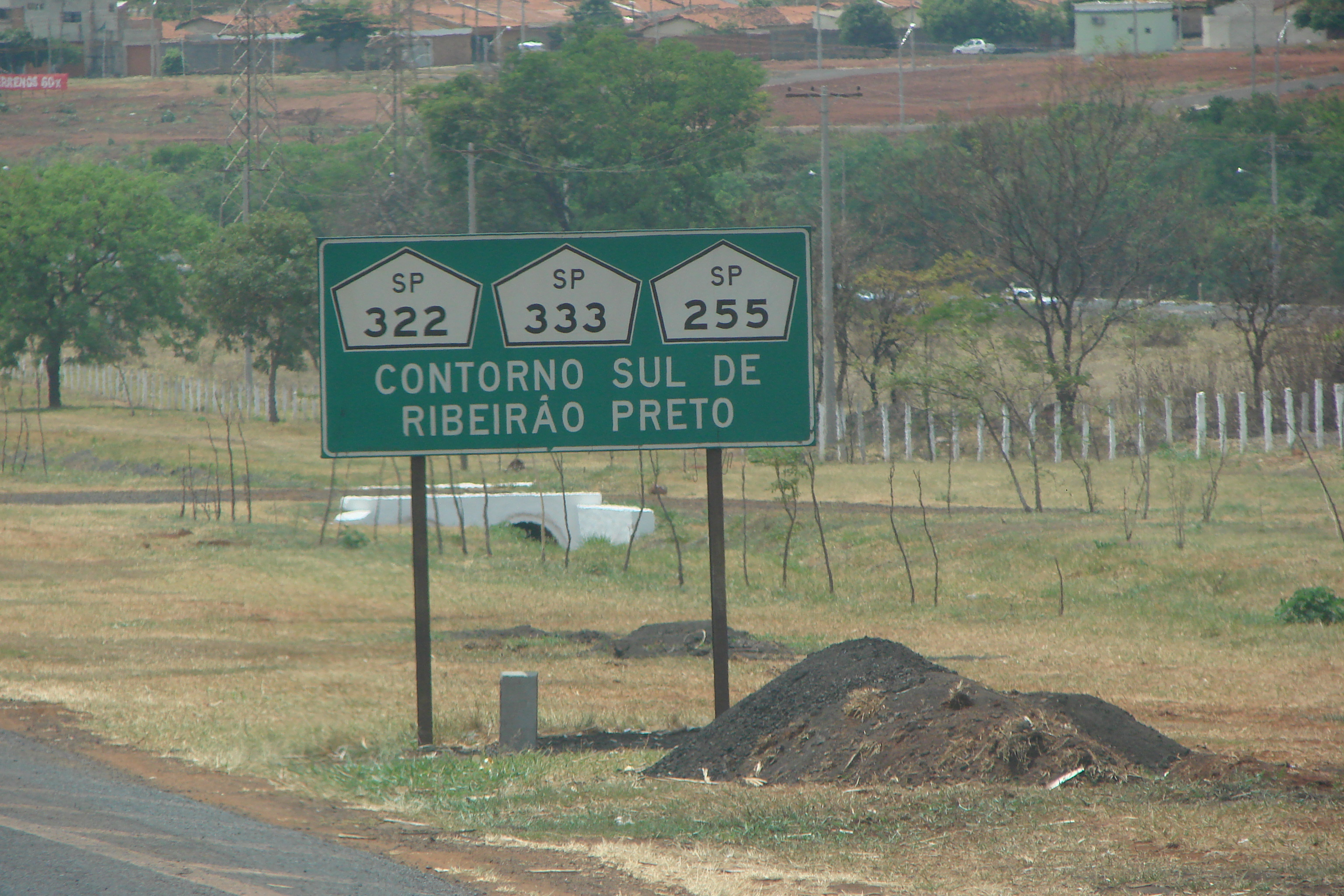
Signpost showing the turnoff

SP-333 is a state highway in the state of São Paulo in Brazil serving the main cities of Ribeirão Preto, Sertãozinho, Jaboticabal, Itápolis, Marília, Assis and Tarumã at the shores of the Paranapanema River, by the border with Paraná.
