= Fundação Educacional do Município de Assis =

University in Assis, Brazil

Fundação Educacional do Município de Assis - FEMA
- Instituto Municipal de Ensino Superior de Assis
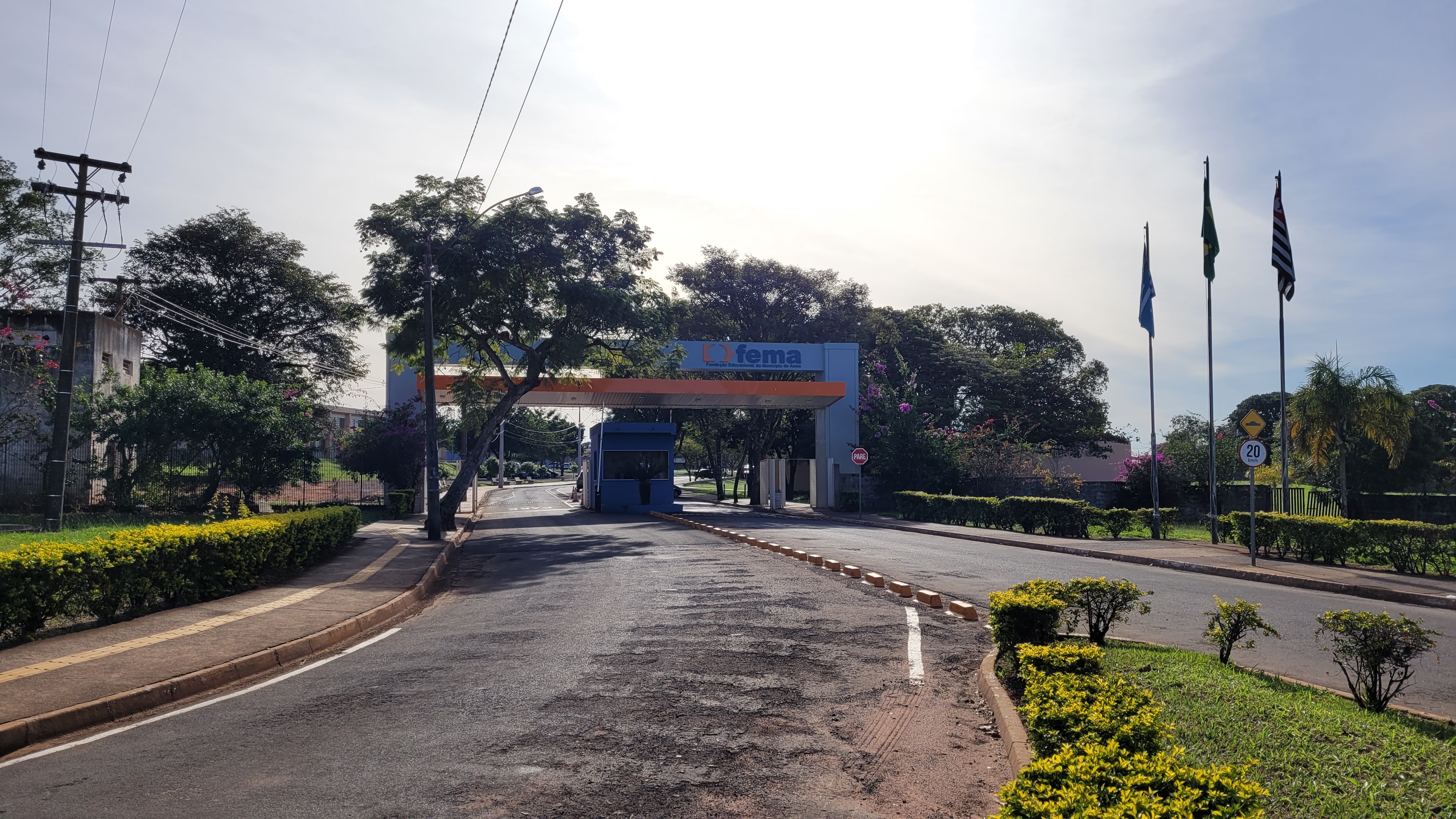
- FEMAs hall of entrance from Getúlio Vargas Avenue
- Motto: Você com atitude. O lugar é aqui.
- Type: city university
- Established: 19 October 1985
- Budget: R$14,330,919
- Principal: Eduardo Augusto Vella Gonçalves
- Students: 2412
- Location: Assis, State of São Paulo, Brazil; 22.6437862°S 50.4213949°W
- Campus: Urban – Getúlio Vargas Avenue, 1200 – Vila Nova Santana
- Language: Portuguese and English (only for some Computer Science classes)
- Colors: blue and orange
- Website: www.fema.edu.br

The Instituto Municipal de Ensino Superior de Assis (IMESA) (or in English Assis's Municipal Institute of Higher Education) is a city university in the city of Assis in Brazil. It is governed by the Fundação Educacional do Município de Assis - FEMA and was founded in 1985 and is controlled by Prefeitura Municipal de Assis. O IMESA have 15 undergraduate and 4 postgraduate courses.

== About ==
FEMA was created in 1985 and the first course of IMESA began in 1988. FEMA was created to satisfy the interest of Paranapanema Valley politicians. In Assis (in this time) that don't had others universities except for UNESP (or in this time, the Institute of Letters, History and Psychology) and Assis's Educational Institute. The firsts undergraduates courses was Mathematical and Data Processing. Today IMESA have 14 courses of undergraduate and 4 courses of postgraduate. It's the second largest university of Assis and the third largest university at Paranapanema Valley.

== Courses ==
Undergraduate

Tecnologia (like a College courses)

- Tecnologia em Análise e Desenvolvimento de Sistemas (Software Engineer and Software development)
- Tecnologia em Fotografia (Photography)

Licenciatura (For teacher formation)

- Matemática (Math)
- Química (Chemical)

Bacharelado (Bachelorship)

- Administração (Management)
- Arquitetura
- Ciência da Computação (Computer Science)
- Ciências Contábeis (Accounting)
- Direito (Law)
- Enfermagem (Nurse)
- Engenharia Civil
- Fisioterapia
- Jornalismo (Journalism)
- Publicidade e Propaganda (Propaganda and Publicity)
- Química Industrial (Industrial Chemical)
- Medicina (Medicine)

Postgraduate (Lato Sensu)

- Administração Financeira, Contábil e Controladoria (Management, Accounting and Controlling)
- Desenvolvimento Gerencial Recursos Humanos (Development of Human resource management)
- Química Ambiental (Environmental chemistry)
- MBA Executivo em Gestão Empresarial (Master of Business Administration and Strategic management)
- Processo Civil: Novos Aspectos na Era Digital (Legal informatics)

Under installation process

- Farmácia (Pharmacology
- Alimentos (Food science)
