= Bernardino de Campos =

- Municipality
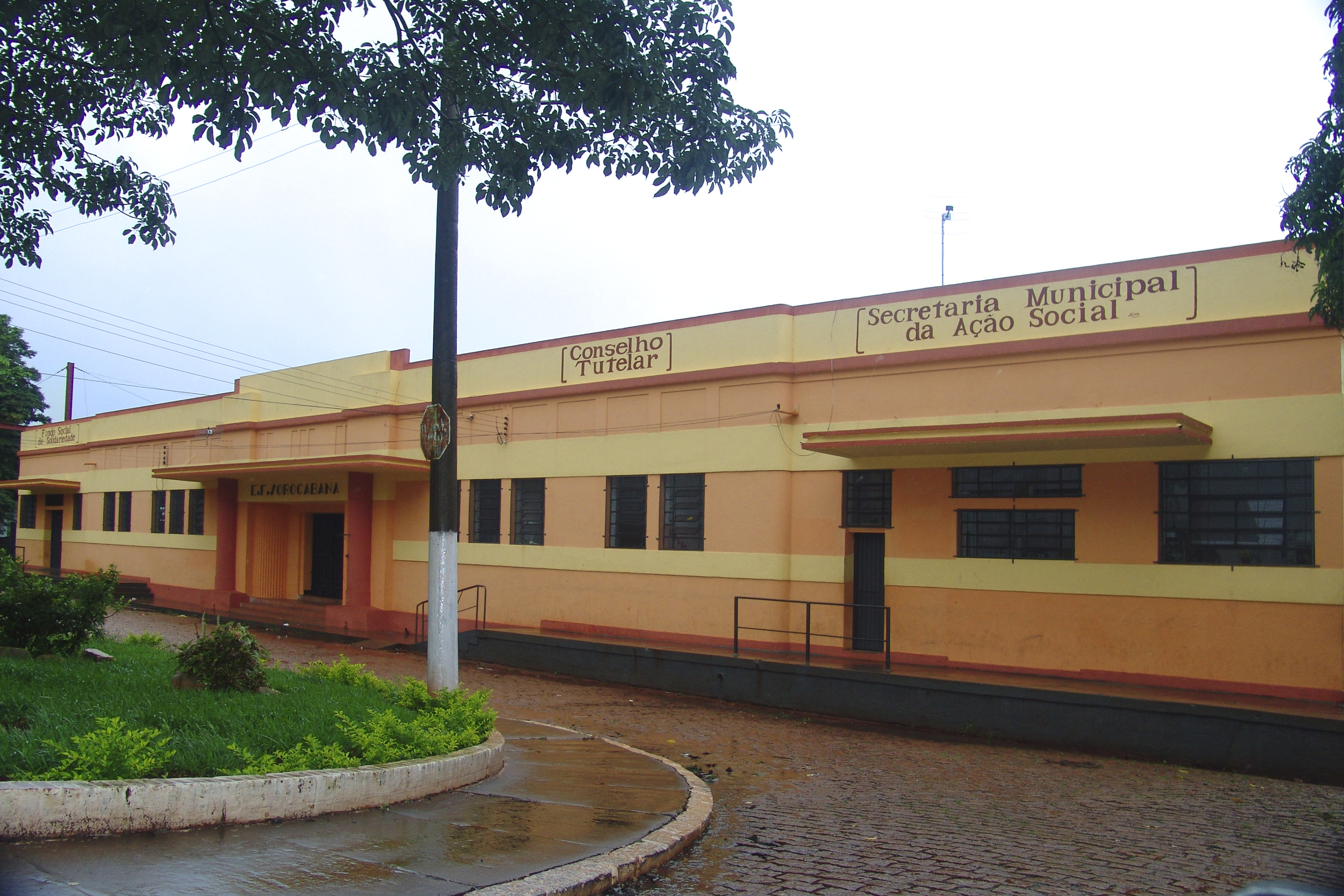
- The old train station, now the town hall

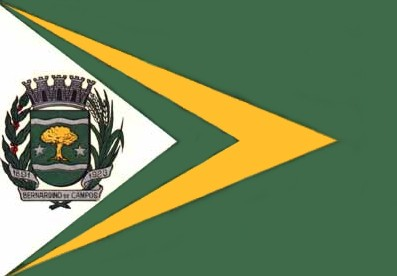
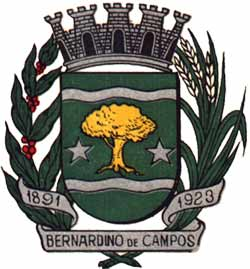
- Flag Coat of arms

- Location in São Paulo state
- Country: Brazil
- Region: Southeast
- State: São Paulo
- Mesoregion: Assis
- Microregion: Ourinhos

Area
  - Total: 244.2 km^{2} (94.3 sq mi)
- Elevation: 695 m (2,280 ft)

Population (2020)
  - Total: 11,158
  - Density: 45.69/km^{2} (118.3/sq mi)
- Time zone: UTC−3 (BRT)

Bernardino de Campos is a municipality in the state of São Paulo in Brazil. The population is 11,158 (2020 est.) in an area of 244.2 km^{2}. The elevation is 695 metres (2,280 ft).

== History ==
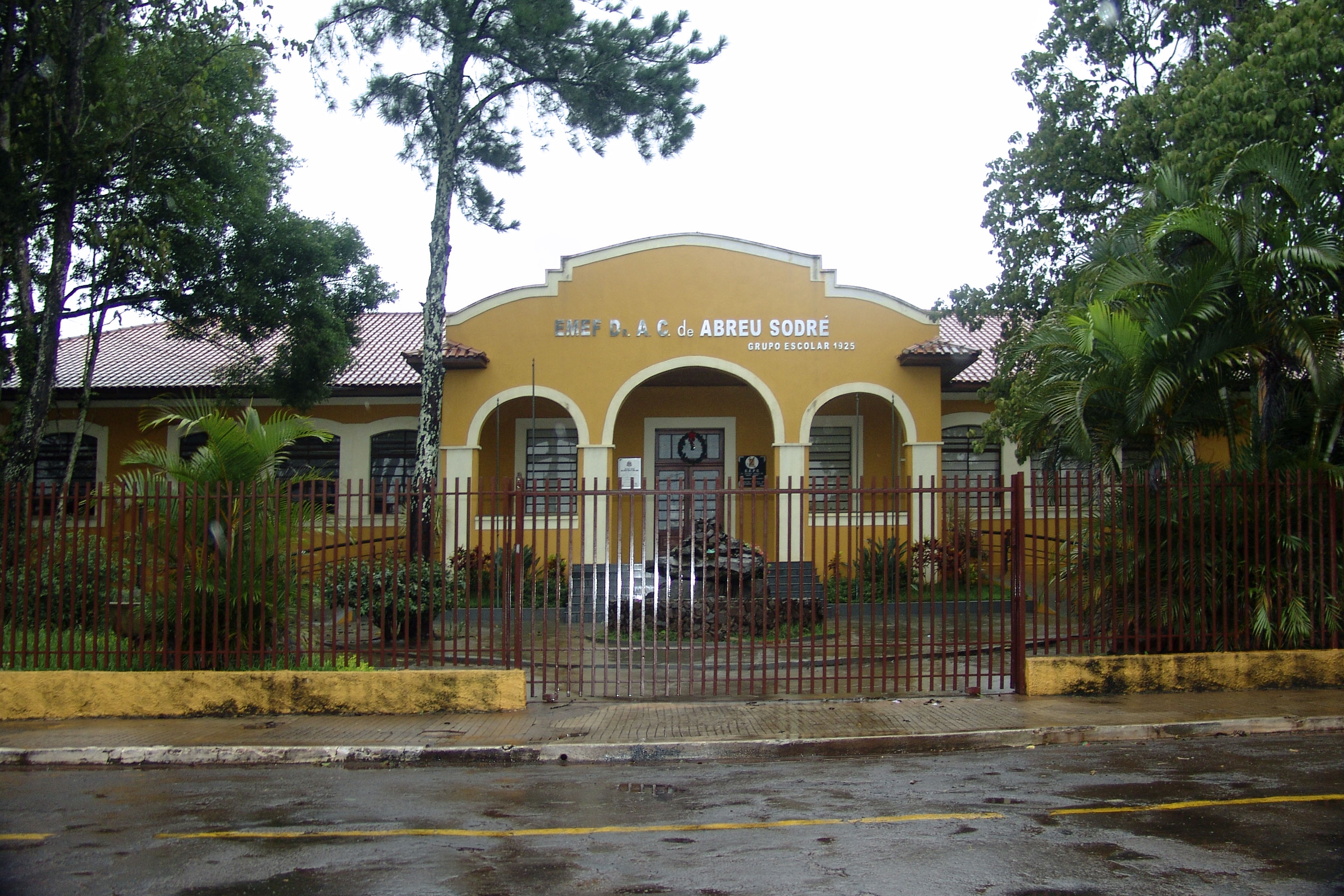
School in the center.

Bernardino de Campos became a municipality on 9 October 1923 by State Law No. 1929, introduced on 22 December of the same year. Until 1886 it was a small village called Douradão, then it took the name of Figueira, and subsequently it was renamed as Peace district (Portuguese: distrito da Paz), and, finally, Bernardino José de Campos Júnior, in honor of the governor of the State of São Paulo of that time. With the arrival of the Sorocabana railroad in 1907, gradually it developed its economy, which is based on agriculture, especially coffee, cotton, sugarcane, maize, and soya beans plantations, and also agribusiness, and dairy and beef cattles.

=== Bernardino de Campos Anthem ===
The municipal anthem, with lyrics written by Peter Jamil Sawaya and music composed by Antenor Ferreira de Godoy, was approved by the city council on 7 December 1970.

== Geography ==
Bernardino de Campos is located at an altitude of 695 metres (2,280 ft), in the interior part of the State of São Paulo, 330 kilometres (210 mi) away from the capital, and it is surrounded by the Paranapanema and Pardo rivers. Its population was 11,777 inhabitants in 2010 census.

== Demographics ==
Historical population (municipality)
Year	Population	%±
1940	10,391	—
1950	9,539	−8.2%
1960	10,865	13.9%
1970	10,243	−5.7%
1980	8,994	−12.2%
1991	10,049	11.7%
2000	10,720	6.7%
2010	10,775	0.5%
2022	11,607	7.7%

== Media ==
In telecommunications, the city was served by Companhia Telefônica Brasileira until 1973, when it began to be served by Telecomunicações de São Paulo. In July 1998, this company was acquired by Telefónica, which adopted the Vivo brand in 2012.

The company is currently an operator of cell phones, fixed lines, internet (fiber optics/4G) and television (satellite and cable).

== See also ==
- List of municipalities in São Paulo
- Interior of São Paulo
