= Espírito Santo do Turvo =

- Municipality
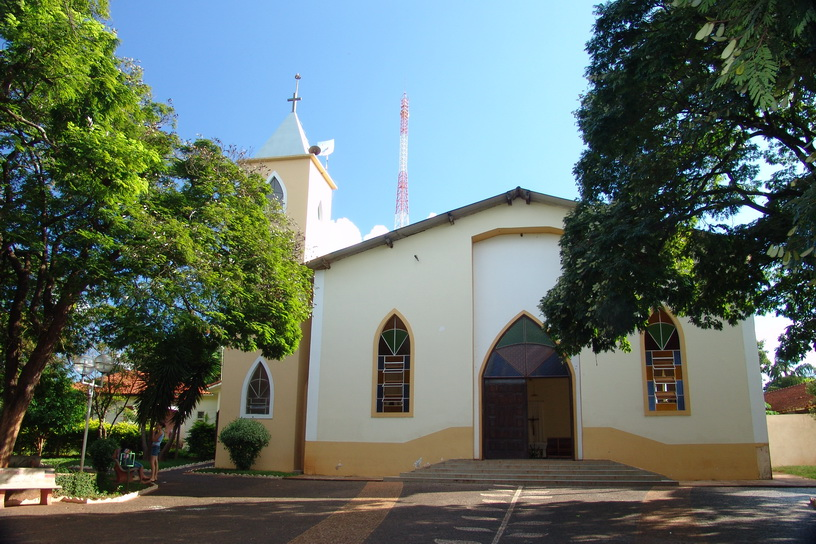

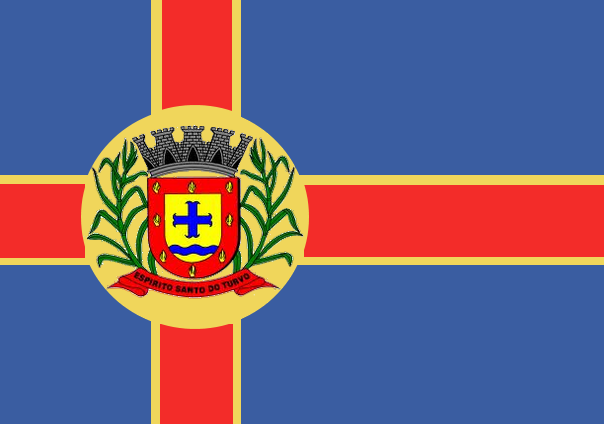
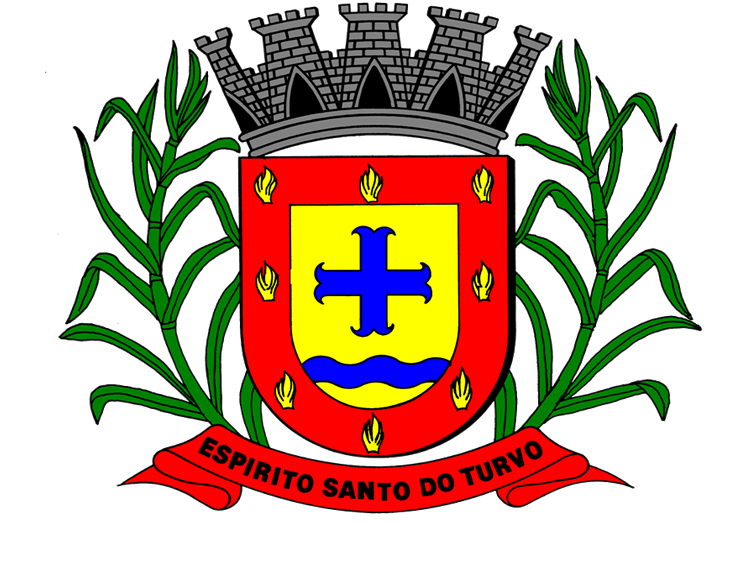
- Flag Coat of arms

- Location of Espírito Santo do Turvo within the State of São Paulo

- Location of Espírito Santo do Turvo within Brazil
- Coordinates: 22°41′31″S 49°25′48″W
- Country: Brazil
- State: São Paulo
- Mesoregion: Assis
- Microregion: Ourinhos
- Established: March 23, 1878

Government
  - Mayor: João Adirson Pacheco (2009–2012)

Area
  - Total: 193.655 km^{2} (74.771 sq mi)
- Elevation: 520 m (1,710 ft)

Population (2020)
  - Total: 4,878
  - Density: 25.19/km^{2} (65.24/sq mi)
- Time zone: UTC−3 (BRT)
- Website: link

Espírito Santo do Turvo is a municipality in the Brazilian state of São Paulo. The population in 2020 was 4,878 and the area is 193.655 square kilometres (74.771 sq mi). The elevation is 520 metres (1,710 ft).

== History ==
The donation of a tract of land for the construction of a church is the landmark in the history of this city. On 23 March 1878, after significant growth Espírito Santo do Turvo (English: Holy Spirit of Turvo) received the title of Freguesia, a secondary local administrative unit in Portugal, by Law No. 08, and was marked as a Religious Heritage Site. Seven years later, in March 1885, the Law No. 20 raised it to the level of Town.

== Government ==
- Mayor: João Adirson Pacheco (2009–2012)

== Geography ==
Espírito Santo do Turvo is located in the southern-subtropical part of Brazil, at 22 degrees, 41 minutes, 31 second south, and 49 degrees, 25 minutes, 48 seconds west, at an altitude of 520 metres (1,710 ft), in the internal part of the State of São Paulo. It covers an area of 193.655 square kilometres (74.771 sq mi).

Rivers

- Turvo River
- Pardo River

== Demography ==
Its population in 2020 was 4,878 inhabitants.

2000 Census figures

Total population: 3,677

- Urban: 3,241
- Rural: 436
- Men: 1,900
- Women: 1,777

Density (inhabitants/km^{2}): 19.22
Infant mortality up to 1 year old (per thousand): 16.70
Life expectancy (years): 70.78
Fertility rate (children per woman): 2.63
Literacy rate: 87.69%
Human Development Index (HDI): 0.755

- Income: 0.666
- Longevity: 0.763
- Education: 0,835

== Economy ==
Its economy is based on agriculture with large production of peanuts and cotton. Espírito Santo do Turvo is an important junction to the south, Mato Grosso, and other regions.

== Media ==
In telecommunications, the city was served by Telecomunicações de São Paulo. In July 1998, this company was acquired by Telefónica, which adopted the Vivo brand in 2012. The company is currently an operator of cell phones, fixed lines, internet (fiber optics/4G) and television (satellite and cable).

== See also ==
- List of municipalities in São Paulo
- Interior of São Paulo
