= Fartura (municipality) =

Municipality in the state of São Paulo in Brazil

- Municipality
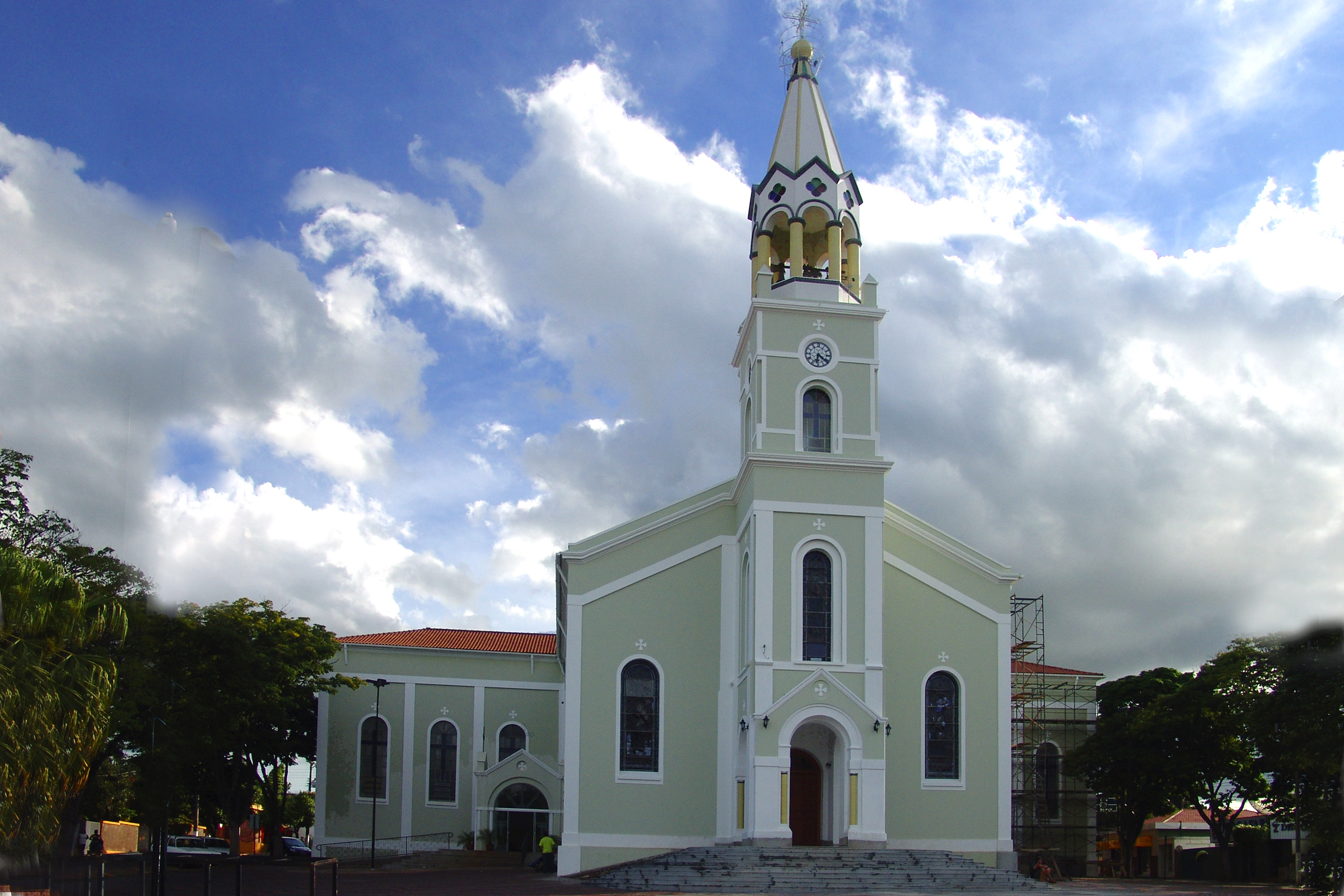

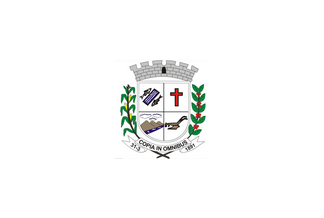
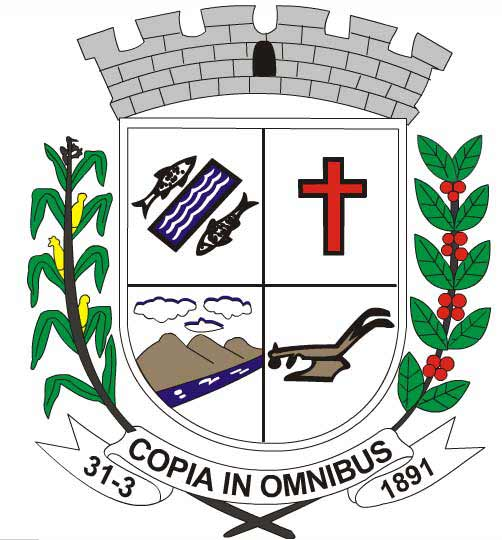
- Flag Coat of arms

- Location in São Paulo state

- Location in Brazil
- Coordinates: 23°23′18″S 49°30′36″W
- Country: Brazil
- Region: Southeast
- State: São Paulo

Area
  - Total: 429 km^{2} (166 sq mi)

Population (2020)
  - Total: 16,070
  - Density: 37.5/km^{2} (97.0/sq mi)
- Time zone: UTC−3 (BRT)

Fartura is a municipality in the state of São Paulo in Brazil. The population is 16,070 (2020 est.) in an area of 429 km^{2}. The elevation is 516 m.

== History ==
Historically inhabited by the Caiová Indians of the Guarani macro-family, the fertile lands of Fartura began to attract settlers in the late 19th century, a time when large settlements were carried out under the leadership of Frei Pacífico de Montefalco and financed by João da Silva Machado, the Baron of Antonina.

In 1880, fulfilling a promise made by his father, Manoel Remígio Viana donated land to Luís Ribeiro Salgado and Vicente de Oliveira Trindade with the obligation to build a chapel in honor of Our Lady of Sorrows, the patron saint of the municipality. The completion of the work was only possible with the efforts of the local families, who had recently built a wooden cross under which they prayed on Sundays and holy days. The strong religiosity of the early inhabitants of Fartura is represented by the vivid red cross on the municipality's coat of arms, a symbol of high Christian faith according to traditional heraldry.

In 1881, the newly inaugurated Municipal Chamber of Piraju sent tax inspector Manuel Martins to Fartura with the aim of collecting the taxes due from the growing settlement, thus beginning its struggle to prevent the village from being elevated to the status of a District and, subsequently, the construction of a new parish. However, on February 7, 1884, Domingos Antônio Raiol, then president of the province, sanctioned Law No. 5 of the Province of São Paulo, elevating the village of Capela Nossa Senhora das Dores de Fartura to the category of Freguesia de Fartura, detaching it from Piraju and annexing it to Itaporanga.

On March 31, 1891, the year of the first republican Constitution, after facing much political resistance, Américo Brasiliense de Almeida Melo issued decree no. 145/1891 of the State of São Paulo, elevating the newly formed Freguesia de Fartura to the status of a municipality. This date is considered the foundation of the municipality, celebrated by the townspeople with EXPOFAR, commonly known as the Fartura Festival. The traditional city anniversary celebration provides residents and visitors from neighboring cities with various artistic and cultural attractions, such as traditional and contemporary country music shows, a festival of country-style guitar, an amusement park, open-air markets, and more.

The disagreement over the name of the municipality was already present among the early inhabitants, but the most accepted version is that Fartura is due to the abundance of fish in the stream that bathes the city.

== Media ==
In telecommunications, the city was served by Telecomunicações de São Paulo. In July 1998, this company was acquired by Telefónica, which adopted the Vivo brand in 2012. The company is currently an operator of cell phones, fixed lines, internet (fiber optics/4G) and television (satellite and cable).

== See also ==
- List of municipalities in São Paulo
- Interior of São Paulo
