= Paraguaçu Paulista =

- Municipality
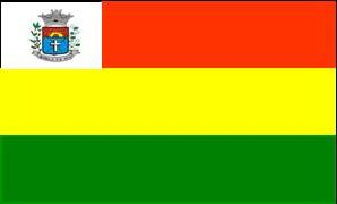
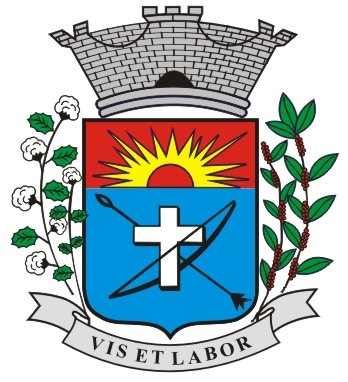
- Flag Coat of arms

- Location in São Paulo state

- Location in Brazil
- Coordinates: 22°25′11″S 50°34′47″W
- Country: Brazil
- Region: Southeast
- State: São Paulo
- Mesoregion: Assis
- Microregion: Assis

Government
  - Mayor: Antônio Takashi Sasada (Antian) (2021 – 2024)

Area
  - Total: 1,001.3 km^{2} (386.6 sq mi)
- Elevation: 506 m (1,660 ft)

Population (2020)
  - Total: 45,945
  - Density: 45.885/km^{2} (118.84/sq mi)
- Time zone: UTC−3 (BRT)
- Postal code: 19700-000
- Area code: +55 18
- Website: eparaguacu.sp.gov.br

Paraguaçu Paulista is a municipality in south-west of the state of São Paulo in Brazil. It is part of the Microregion of Assis, situated in the middle Paranapanema Valley. The population is 45,945 (2020 est.) in an area of 1001.3 km^{2}. It's the second largest population of microregion and the 3rd of mesoregion, and is 422 km away from the capital, São Paulo.

== History ==
Paraguaçu was created as a district of the (then) municipality of Conceição de Monte Alegre in 1923. It became a separate municipality in 1924. Its name was changed to Paraguaçu Paulista in 1948.

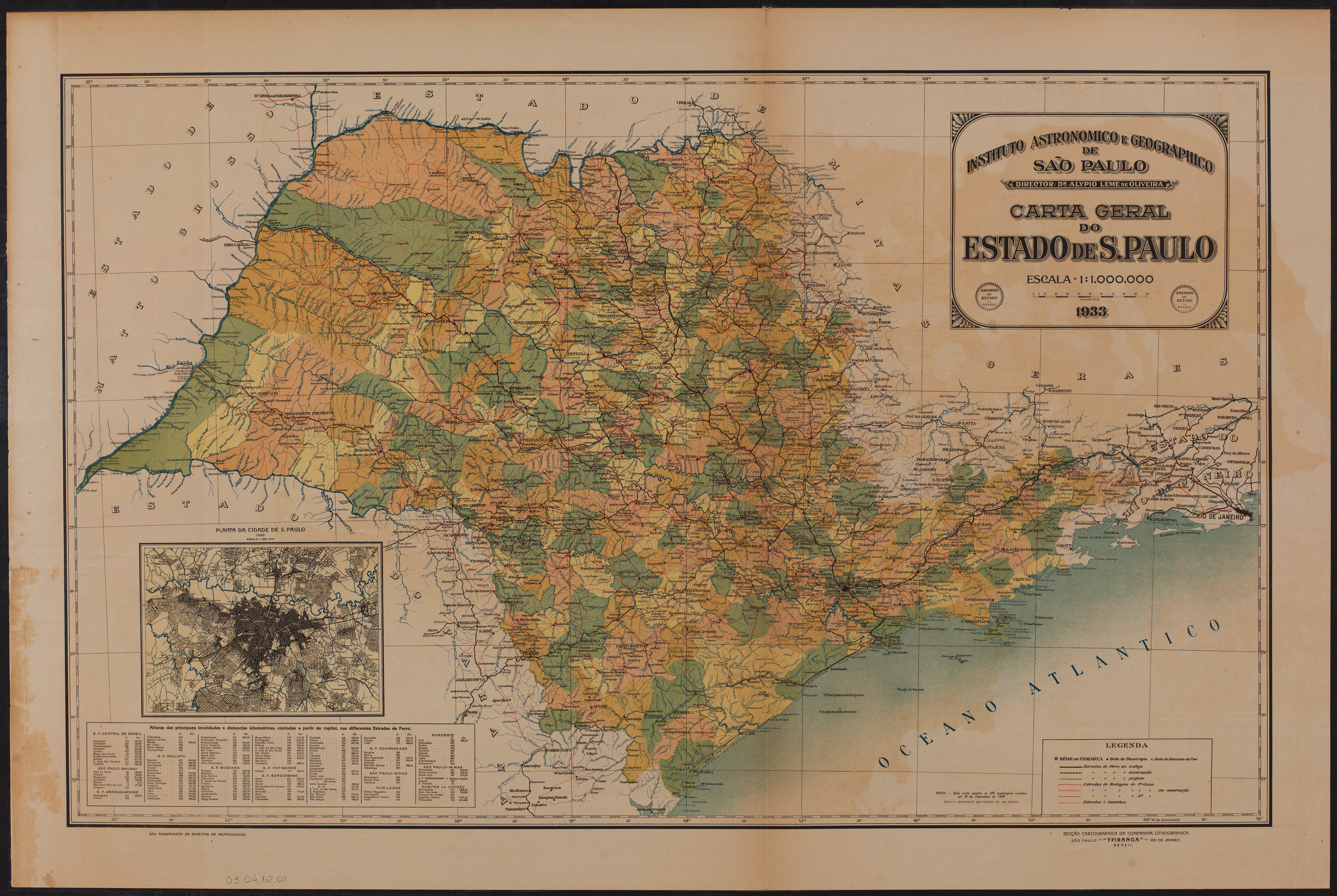
Map of the state of São Paulo (1933).

== Geography ==
=== Districts ===
The municipality is subdivided into the following districts:

- Paraguaçu Paulista – municipal seat
- Conceição de Monte Alegre
- Roseta
- Sapezal

== Media ==
In telecommunications, the city was served by Telecomunicações de São Paulo. In July 1998, this company was acquired by Telefónica, which adopted the Vivo brand in 2012. The company is currently an operator of cell phones, fixed lines, internet (fiber optics/4G) and television (satellite and cable).

== Religion ==
Christianity is present in the city as follows:

=== Catholic Church ===
The Catholic church in the municipality is part of the Roman Catholic Diocese of Assis.

=== Protestant Church ===
The most diverse evangelical beliefs are present in the city, mainly Pentecostal, including the Assemblies of God in Brazil (the largest evangelical church in the country), Christian Congregation in Brazil, among others. These denominations are growing more and more throughout Brazil.

== See also ==
- List of municipalities in São Paulo
- Interior of São Paulo
