= Campos Novos Paulista =

Municipality in the state of São Paulo in Brazil

- Municipality
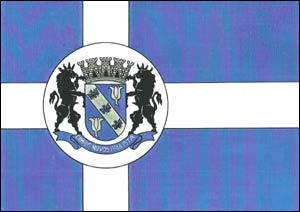
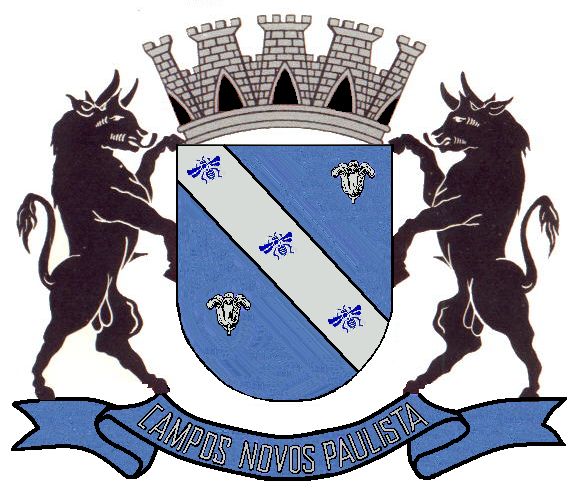
- Flag Coat of arms

- Location in São Paulo state

- Location in Brazil
- Coordinates: 22°36′11″S 50°0′9″W
- Country: Brazil
- Region: Southeast
- State: São Paulo

Area
  - Total: 484 km^{2} (187 sq mi)

Population (2020)
  - Total: 4,997
  - Density: 10.3/km^{2} (26.7/sq mi)
- Time zone: UTC−3 (BRT)

Campos Novos Paulista is a municipality in the state of São Paulo in Brazil. As of the 2020 estimate, the population is 4,997, and the municipality covers an area of 484 square kilometres (187 sq mi). The elevation is 446 metres (1,463 ft).

== History ==
Originally named Campos Novos do Paranapanema in 1880, the municipality's name was later simplified to Campos Novos and finally changed to its current name around 1940. The region was originally inhabited by the Caingangues people and was later colonized by immigrants. The land was primarily used for coffee production.

The municipality was established in 1885 and re-established through state law in 1948.

Map of the state of São Paulo (1948).

== Media ==
In telecommunications, the city was served by Companhia de Telecomunicações do Estado de São Paulo until 1973, when it began to be served by Telecomunicações de São Paulo. In July 1998, the company was acquired by Telefônica, which introduced the Vivo brand in 2012. Today, the company operates cellular services, fixed lines, internet (fiber optics and 4G), and television (satellite and cable).

== See also ==
- List of municipalities in São Paulo
- Interior of São Paulo
