= Borá =

Municipality in the state of São Paulo in Brazil

- Municipality
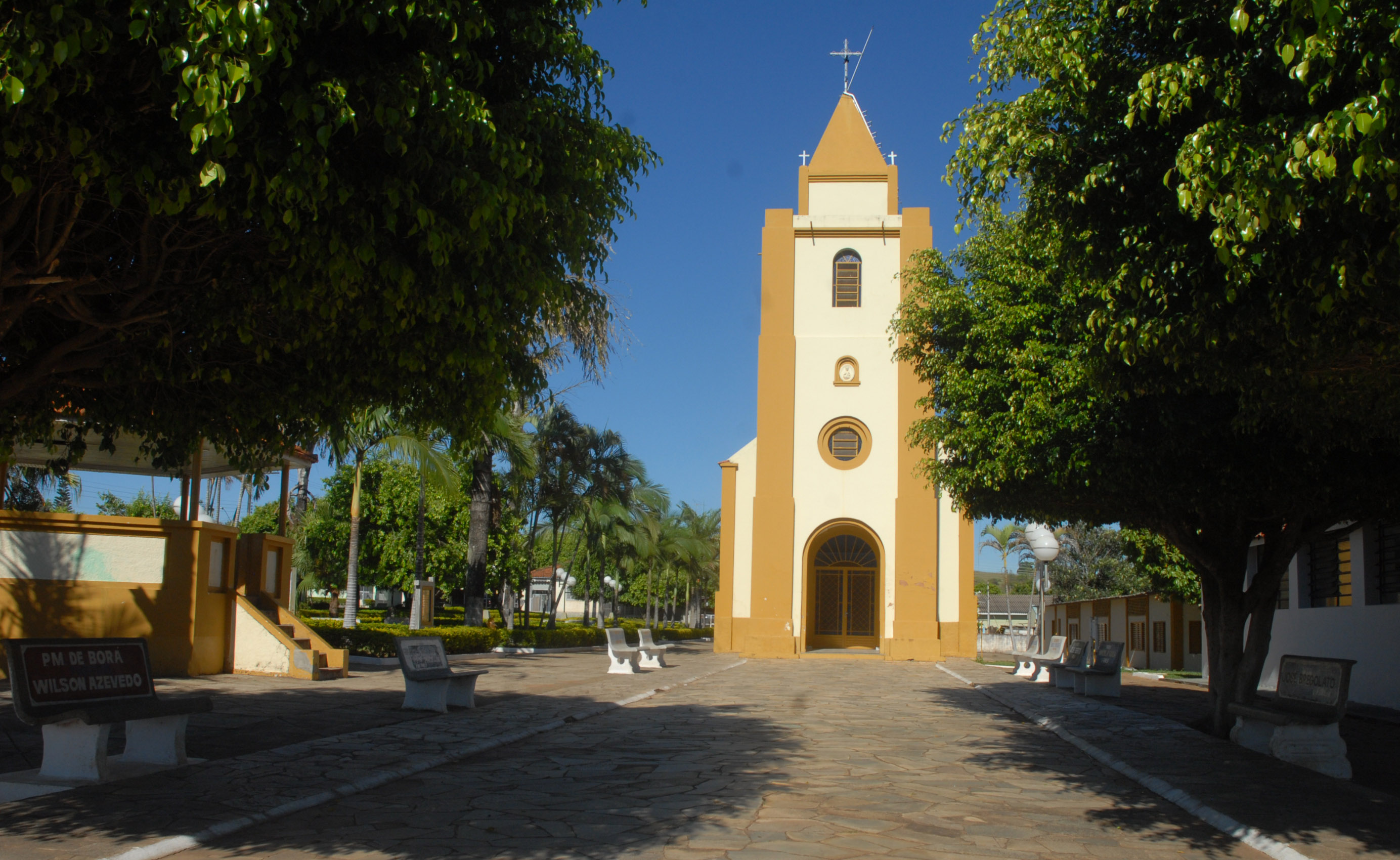

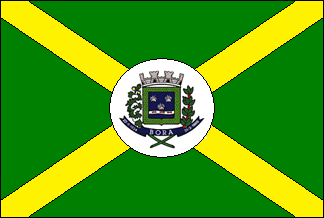
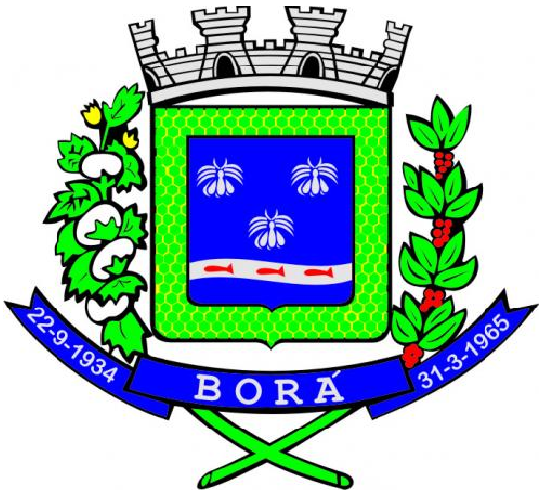
- Flag Coat of arms

- Location in São Paulo state

- Location in Brazil
- Coordinates: 22°16′14″S 50°32′41″W
- Country: Brazil
- Region: Southeast
- State: São Paulo
- Founded: 1918
- Recognized: 1934

Government
  - Mayor: Luiz Carlos Rodrigues (PTB)

Area
  - Total: 119 km^{2} (46 sq mi)

Population (2020)
  - Total: 838
  - Density: 7.04/km^{2} (18.2/sq mi)
- Time zone: UTC−3 (BRT)

Borá is a municipality in the state of São Paulo in Brazil. The population is 838 (2020 est.) in an area of 119 km^{2} (46 sq mi). The elevation is 582 m. Borá is the least populated municipality in São Paulo and the second least populated in Brazil. Its foundation dates from around 1918, with the merchant Vedovatti family, being formally recognized in 1934, and becoming a municipality in 1965.

== Demographics ==
Historical population (municipality)
Year	Population	%±
1970	1,270	—
1980	866	−31.8%
1991	751	−13.3%
2000	795	5.9%
2010	805	1.3%
2022	907	12.7%
Est. 2024	928	2.3%

== Media ==
In telecommunications, the city was served by Companhia de Telecomunicações do Estado de São Paulo until 1973, when it began to be served by Telecomunicações de São Paulo. In July 1998, this company was acquired by Telefónica, which adopted the Vivo brand in 2012.

The company is currently an operator of cell phones, fixed lines, internet (fiber optics/4G) and television (satellite and cable).

== Religion ==
Christianity is present in the city as follows:

=== Catholic Church ===
The Catholic church in the municipality is part of the Roman Catholic Diocese of Assis.

=== Protestant Church ===
The most diverse evangelical beliefs are present in the city, mainly Pentecostal, including the Assemblies of God in Brazil (the largest evangelical church in the country), Christian Congregation in Brazil, among others. These denominations are growing more and more throughout Brazil.

== See also ==
- List of municipalities in São Paulo
- Interior of São Paulo
