= Tarumã =

- Municipality
- Município de Tarumã; Municipality of Tarumã
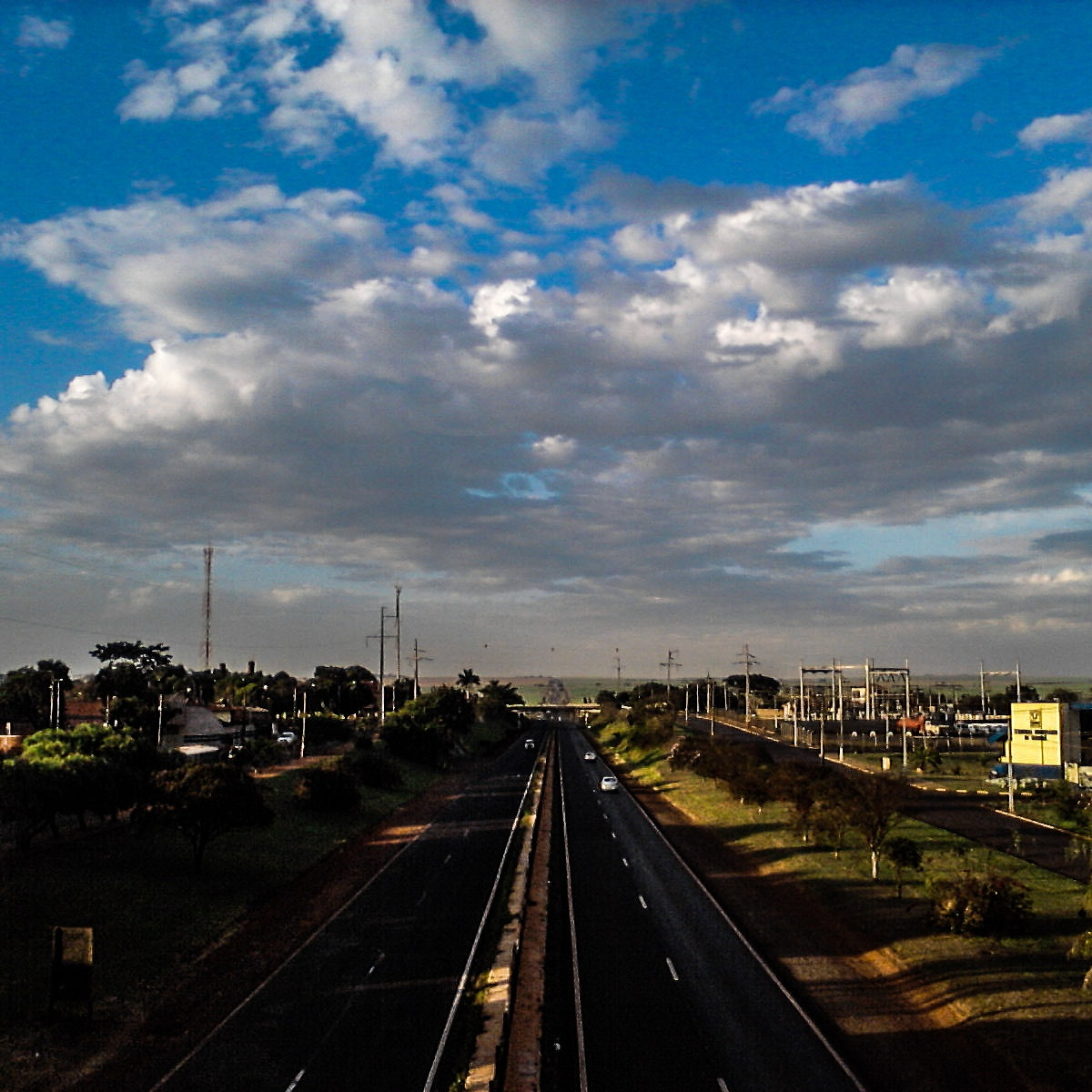
- Partial view of Tarumã

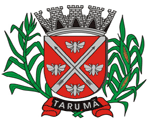
- Flag Coat of arms
- Nicknames: The City of Tomorrow; Digital City
- Motto: Together We Are More
- Location in São Paulo and the state of São Paulo

- Location in Brazil
- Coordinates: 22°44′48″S 50°34′38″W
- Country: Brazil
- Region: Southeast
- State: São Paulo
- Founded: October 20, 1927

Government
  - Mayor: Jairo da Costa e Silva (2013-2016)

Area
  - Total: 302.913 km^{2} (116.955 sq mi)
- Elevation: 509 m (1,670 ft)

Population (2020)
  - Total: 15,183
  - Density: 42.5/km^{2} (110/sq mi)
- Demonym: Tarumãense
- Time zone: UTC−3 (BRT)
- ZIP codes: 19820-000
- Area code: (+55) 18
- Website: www.taruma.sp.gov.br

Tarumã is a municipality in the state of São Paulo in Brazil. It was founded in October 20, 1927 and has a population of 15,183. It is 455 km away from the capital, São Paulo.

== History ==
Tarumã started as a village called Vila Lex (Lex Village), named for its founder Gilberto Lex, a German immigrant who arrived in Brazil in 1825. Its present name comes from a Tupi–Guarani word for the indigenous fruit tree Vitex montevidensis.

The town was elevated to District of Peace in 1927, and to municipality status in 1993. The first mayor of the municipality was Oscar Gozzi.

== Geography ==
The town has an annual average temperature of 23.1 °C and the vegetation predominates Mata Atlântica and Cerrado, is then a transition zone of vegetation.

== Demographics ==
Its Human Development Index (HDI) in 2010 was 0.775. In 2010, it occupied the 20th place in the ranking of the 100 best cities to live in Brazil and the placement of 19th place in the ranking of best cities in the state of São Paulo, according to the Municipal Development Index Firjan.

== Government ==
Mayor: Oscar Gozzi (2017–2020)

== Media ==
In telecommunications, the city was served by Telecomunicações de São Paulo. In July 1998, this company was acquired by Telefónica, which adopted the Vivo brand in 2012. The company is currently an operator of cell phones, fixed lines, internet (fiber optics/4G) and television (satellite and cable).

== Religion ==
Christianity is present in the city as follows:

=== Catholic Church ===
The Catholic church in the municipality is part of the Roman Catholic Diocese of Assis.

=== Protestant Church ===
The most diverse evangelical beliefs are present in the city, mainly Pentecostal, including the Assemblies of God in Brazil (the largest evangelical church in the country), Christian Congregation in Brazil, among others. These denominations are growing more and more throughout Brazil.

== See also ==
- List of municipalities in São Paulo
- Interior of São Paulo
