= List of municipalities in São Paulo by HDI =

This is a list of municipalities in São Paulo ordered by Human Development Index (HDI) according to data released by the United Nations Development Program (UNDP) of the United Nations for the 2010. The Human Development Index was developed in 1990 by the Pakistani economist Mahbub ul Haq and the Indian economist Amartya Sen.

According to the list. of the 645 municipalities in the state of São Paulo, 24 have very high HDI (equal to or greater than 0.800), 556 have high HDI (between 0.700 and 0.799), 61 have medium (between 0.600 and 0.699), none of them have low (between 0.500 and 0.599), and none of them have very low (less than 0.500). The HDI of São Paulo is 0.819 (considered very high).

== Criteria ==
Map of HDI of the municipalities of São Paulo. Legend: Very high (24 municipalities) High (556 municipalities) Medium (61 municipalities) Low (no municipality) Very low (no municipality)

=== Categories ===
The index varies from 0 to 1, considering:

- Very high – 0.800 to 1.000
- High – 0.700 to 0.799
- Medium – 0.600 to 0.699
- Low – 0.500 to 0.599
- Very low – 0.000 to 0.499

=== Components ===
The HDI of the municipalities is an average between the income index, life expectancy index and educational index.

== List ==
Rank	Municipalities	Data of 2010			
Rank	Municipalities	HDI	Income Index	Life Expectancy Index	Educational Index
Very high HDI
1	São Caetano do Sul	0.862	0.891	0.887	0.811
2	Águas de São Pedro	0.854	0.849	0.890	0.825
3	Santos	0.840	0.861	0.852	0.807
4	Jundiaí	0.822	0.834	0.866	0.768
5	Valinhos	0.819	0.848	0.850	0.763
6	Vinhedo	0.817	0.840	0.878	0.739
7	Araraquara	0.815	0.788	0.877	0.782
7	Santo André	0.815	0.819	0.861	0.769
9	Santana de Parnaíba	0.814	0.876	0.849	0.725
10	Ilha Solteira	0.812	0.786	0.871	0.782
11	Americana	0.811	0.800	0.876	0.760
12	São José dos Campos	0.807	0.804	0.855	0.764
13	Presidente Prudente	0.806	0.788	0.858	0.774
14	São Bernardo do Campo	0.805	0.807	0.861	0.752
15	São Paulo	0.805	0.843	0.855	0.725
16	Assis	0.805	0.771	0.865	0.781
17	Campinas	0.805	0.829	0.860	0.731
18	São Carlos	0.805	0.788	0.863	0.766
19	Rio Claro	0.803	0.784	0.862	0.766
20	Bauru	0.801	0.800	0.854	0.752
21	Pirassununga	0.801	0.789	0.884	0.736
22	Taubaté	0.800	0.778	0.883	0.746
22	Ribeirão Preto	0.800	0.820	0.844	0.739
22	Botucatu	0.800	0.790	0.869	0.746
High HDI
25	Marília	0.798	0.768	0.854	0.776
25	Sorocaba	0.798	0.792	0.843	0.762
25	Guaratinguetá	0.798	0.764	0.886	0.751
28	Fernandópolis	0.797	0.767	0.872	0.758
28	São João da Boa Vista	0.797	0.776	0.871	0.749
28	São José do Rio Preto	0.797	0.801	0.846	0.748
31	Paulínia	0.795	0.800	0.864	0.727
32	Holambra	0.793	0.815	0.878	0.698
33	Nova Odessa	0.791	0.755	0.861	0.762
33	Saltinho	0.791	0.771	0.857	0.750
35	Votuporanga	0.790	0.772	0.857	0.744
35	Santa Cruz da Conceição	0.790	0.830	0.876	0.679
35	Adamantina	0.790	0.772	0.852	0.750
38	Barretos	0.789	0.762	0.875	0.738
38	Cândido Rodrigues	0.789	0.747	0.863	0.762
40	Barra Bonita	0.788	0.762	0.869	0.739
40	Cruzeiro	0.788	0.742	0.871	0.758
40	Caçapava	0.788	0.754	0.858	0.755
40	Mairiporã	0.788	0.767	0.881	0.723
40	Indaiatuba	0.788	0.791	0.837	0.738
40	Araçatuba	0.788	0.782	0.841	0.744
46	Espírito Santo do Pinhal	0.787	0.784	0.872	0.712
47	Pompeia	0.786	0.750	0.864	0.748
47	Lins	0.786	0.762	0.869	0.733
47	Barueri	0.786	0.791	0.866	0.708
50	Piracicaba	0.785	0.797	0.848	0.717
50	Tremembé	0.785	0.769	0.873	0.720
50	Amparo	0.785	0.780	0.871	0.711
50	Catanduva	0.785	0.767	0.853	0.740
50	Monte Aprazível	0.785	0.781	0.861	0.720
55	Arujá	0.784	0.761	0.866	0.730
55	Mogi Mirim	0.784	0.767	0.879	0.715
55	Santa Fé do Sul	0.784	0.763	0.840	0.751
55	Ribeirão Pires	0.784	0.749	0.847	0.760
60	Mogi das Cruzes	0.783	0.762	0.851	0.740
61	Cerquilho	0.782	0.758	0.854	0.739
62	Águas da Prata	0.781	0.750	0.886	0.716
62	Araras	0.781	0.763	0.859	0.728
62	Caieiras	0.781	0.740	0.861	0.749
62	Santa Bárbara d'Oeste	0.781	0.752	0.867	0.731
66	Franca	0.780	0.749	0.842	0.753
66	Bebedouro	0.780	0.756	0.853	0.735
66	Cotia	0.780	0.789	0.851	0.707
66	Birigui	0.780	0.743	0.869	0.734
66	Boituva	0.780	0.757	0.861	0.728
66	Orlândia	0.780	0.765	0.882	0.703
66	Salto	0.780	0.755	0.837	0.751
73	Andradina	0.779	0.762	0.885	0.702
73	Piratininga	0.779	0.762	0.859	0.723
75	Tietê	0.778	0.764	0.884	0.698
75	Ourinhos	0.778	0.753	0.859	0.727
75	Itatiba	0.778	0.788	0.844	0.708
75	Jaboticabal	0.778	0.778	0.851	0.710
75	Jaú	0.778	0.768	0.886	0.693
80	Louveira	0.777	0.783	0.861	0.697
80	José Bonifácio	0.777	0.752	0.869	0.717
80	Jacareí	0.777	0.749	0.837	0.749
83	Iracemápolis	0.776	0.742	0.863	0.729
83	Bragança Paulista	0.776	0.772	0.861	0.704
83	Osasco	0.776	0.776	0.840	0.718
83	Dracena	0.776	0.752	0.842	0.737
83	Araçoiaba da Serra	0.776	0.751	0.860	0.723
83	Pirapozinho	0.776	0.740	0.863	0.733
83	Jales	0.776	0.750	0.855	0.730
90	Santa Rita do Passa Quatro	0.775	0.764	0.887	0.686
90	Limeira	0.775	0.761	0.852	0.719
92	São José do Rio Pardo	0.774	0.744	0.868	0.717
92	Pedrinhas Paulista	0.774	0.749	0.837	0.739
92	Cruzália	0.774	0.698	0.853	0.778
92	Mogi Guaçu	0.774	0.740	0.852	0.736
96	Olímpia	0.773	0.737	0.867	0.736
96	Pindamonhangaba	0.773	0.745	0.843	0.736
96	Auriflama	0.773	0.746	0.840	0.738
96	Matão	0.773	0.766	0.847	0.713
96	Sebastianópolis do Sul	0.773	0.748	0.835	0.740
96	Itu	0.773	0.782	0.854	0.692
96	Santana da Ponte Pensa	0.773	0.751	0.840	0.733
103	Monções	0.772	0.731	0.814	0.773
103	Sales Oliveira	0.772	0.738	0.845	0.739
103	Santa Salete	0.772	0.712	0.864	0.748
103	São Sebastião	0.772	0.747	0.875	0.703
107	Poá	0.771	0.710	0.856	0.754
107	Maracaí	0.771	0.711	0.850	0.758
107	Tupã	0.771	0.764	0.852	0.704
110	Vargem Grande Paulista	0.770	0.755	0.884	0.683
110	Santa Rosa de Viterbo	0.770	0.746	0.868	0.704
110	Macatuba	0.770	0.763	0.859	0.697
110	Oriente	0.770	0.717	0.837	0.761
110	Ouroeste	0.770	0.717	0.866	0.736
115	Campo Limpo Paulista	0.769	0.733	0.840	0.739
115	Tupi Paulista	0.769	0.762	0.835	0.715
115	Garça	0.769	0.737	0.849	0.728
115	Cosmópolis	0.769	0.746	0.876	0.697
115	Pedreira	0.769	0.750	0.864	0.701
115	Taboão da Serra	0.769	0.742	0.863	0.710
121	Monte Alto	0.768	0.746	0.859	0.707
121	São Vicente	0.768	0.738	0.857	0.716
121	Regente Feijó	0.768	0.735	0.818	0.752
121	São Roque	0.768	0.765	0.863	0.687
121	Igarapava	0.768	0.809	0.835	0.671
121	Bilac	0.768	0.743	0.845	0.722
127	Orindiúva	0.767	0.719	0.824	0.762
127	Serra Negra	0.767	0.764	0.873	0.676
127	Votorantim	0.767	0.720	0.838	0.747
127	Avaré	0.767	0.751	0.866	0.695
131	Mauá	0.766	0.721	0.852	0.733
131	Lorena	0.766	0.736	0.856	0.713
131	Alumínio	0.766	0.729	0.841	0.732
131	Poloni	0.766	0.736	0.853	0.717
131	Cedral	0.766	0.749	0.872	0.689
131	São Simão	0.766	0.732	0.852	0.722
131	Pereira Barreto	0.766	0.728	0.845	0.732
138	Nova Europa	0.765	0.718	0.869	0.718
138	Suzano	0.765	0.708	0.873	0.723
138	Atibaia	0.765	0.786	0.851	0.670
138	Ituverava	0.765	0.768	0.841	0.694
142	Cachoeira Paulista	0.764	0.733	0.837	0.728
142	Rosana	0.764	0.749	0.818	0.728
142	Lençóis Paulista	0.764	0.743	0.837	0.717
145	Itapetininga	0.763	0.728	0.864	0.705
145	Guarulhos	0.763	0.746	0.831	0.717
145	Buritama	0.763	0.736	0.839	0.720
145	Gabriel Monteiro	0.763	0.721	0.809	0.762
145	Presidente Venceslau	0.763	0.749	0.837	0.708
145	Guararapes	0.763	0.727	0.840	0.726
151	Itapira	0.762	0.750	0.852	0.692
151	Itupeva	0.762	0.750	0.844	0.699
151	Osvaldo Cruz	0.762	0.740	0.837	0.713
151	Mococa	0.762	0.756	0.827	0.709
151	Mirassol	0.762	0.748	0.846	0.698
151	Santa Cruz do Rio Pardo	0.762	0.744	0.867	0.686
151	Paraguaçu Paulista	0.762	0.717	0.836	0.739
151	Sumaré	0.762	0.744	0.845	0.705
151	São Joaquim da Barra	0.762	0.740	0.847	0.706
160	Sertãozinho	0.761	0.768	0.855	0.672
160	Batatais	0.761	0.766	0.840	0.685
160	Indiana	0.761	0.714	0.843	0.733
160	Santa Rita d'Oeste	0.761	0.711	0.839	0.740
164	Itirapuã	0.760	0.735	0.832	0.743
164	Taiúva	0.760	0.732	0.835	0.718
164	Santa Adélia	0.760	0.750	0.835	0.702
164	Jandira	0.760	0.738	0.841	0.706
164	Descalvado	0.760	0.740	0.865	0.687
164	Estrela d'Oeste	0.760	0.712	0.873	0.705
169	Várzea Paulista	0.759	0.720	0.863	0.705
169	Rubinéia	0.759	0.713	0.844	0.726
169	Caraguatatuba	0.759	0.735	0.845	0.705
169	Monte Alegre do Sul	0.759	0.752	0.858	0.678
169	Rio das Pedras	0.759	0.741	0.842	0.700
169	Inúbia Paulista	0.759	0.688	0.849	0.750
169	Taquaral	0.759	0.742	0.823	0.716
169	Penápolis	0.759	0.748	0.859	0.680
177	Piraju	0.758	0.740	0.843	0.699
177	Cordeirópolis	0.758	0.754	0.858	0.674
177	Fernando Prestes	0.758	0.746	0.859	0.680
177	Álvares Machado	0.758	0.712	0.834	0.732
177	Porto Feliz	0.758	0.737	0.836	0.706
182	Diadema	0.757	0.717	0.844	0.716
182	Águas de Santa Bárbara	0.757	0.744	0.840	0.695
182	Piquete	0.757	0.711	0.823	0.740
182	Colina	0.757	0.720	0.845	0.712
182	Santo Antônio do Aracanguá	0.757	0.710	0.840	0.728
182	Presidente Bernardes	0.757	0.718	0.839	0.719
188	Nova Castilho	0.756	0.694	0.823	0.755
188	Cravinhos	0.756	0.737	0.857	0.683
188	Hortolândia	0.756	0.716	0.859	0.703
188	Bálsamo	0.756	0.746	0.835	0.695
188	Pirangi	0.756	0.735	0.837	0.701
188	Ilhabela	0.756	0.739	0.843	0.693
188	Jambeiro	0.756	0.727	0.860	0.690
195	Aparecida	0.755	0.735	0.828	0.706
195	São Pedro	0.755	0.741	0.863	0.674
195	Brodowski	0.755	0.738	0.864	0.675
195	Pongaí	0.755	0.727	0.844	0.701
199	Analândia	0.754	0.745	0.861	0.668
199	Neves Paulista	0.754	0.737	0.823	0.707
199	Vera Cruz	0.754	0.722	0.830	0.715
199	Mongaguá	0.754	0.719	0.854	0.699
199	Registro	0.754	0.718	0.851	0.702
199	Praia Grande	0.754	0.744	0.834	0.692
199	Corumbataí	0.754	0.728	0.841	0.700
199	Boracéia	0.754	0.723	0.866	0.685
207	Guaíra	0.753	0.759	0.824	0.683
207	Novo Horizonte	0.753	0.741	0.865	0.665
207	Monte Azul Paulista	0.753	0.733	0.843	0.690
207	Santo Anastácio	0.753	0.725	0.854	0.689
207	Tarumã	0.753	0.738	0.852	0.680
207	Magda	0.753	0.724	0.823	0.717
207	Três Fronteiras	0.753	0.710	0.829	0.726
207	Ipeúna	0.753	0.737	0.845	0.685
207	Palmeira d'Oeste	0.753	0.720	0.829	0.714
216	Tatuí	0.752	0.734	0.842	0.688
216	Marapoama	0.752	0.736	0.852	0.679
216	Lucélia	0.752	0.728	0.841	0.695
219	Turiúba	0.751	0.713	0.824	0.721
219	Tapiratiba	0.751	0.703	0.870	0.692
219	Indiaporã	0.751	0.714	0.835	0.710
219	Porto Ferreira	0.751	0.736	0.827	0.696
219	Mirandópolis	0.751	0.732	0.869	0.665
219	Catiguá	0.751	0.734	0.852	0.676
219	Sales	0.751	0.708	0.859	0.697
219	Ubatuba	0.751	0.741	0.841	0.679
219	Américo Brasiliense	0.751	0.709	0.852	0.701
219	Guarujá	0.751	0.729	0.854	0.679
219	Nhandeara	0.751	0.729	0.835	0.672
219	Rancharia	0.751	0.720	0.861	0.683
219	Bastos	0.751	0.696	0.848	0.718
232	Presidente Epitácio	0.750	0.714	0.845	0.700
232	Bariri	0.750	0.736	0.867	0.662
232	Capivari	0.750	0.744	0.848	0.669
232	São João do Pau d'Alho	0.750	0.714	0.854	0.692
236	Paraíso	0.749	0.751	0.837	0.668
236	Artur Nogueira	0.749	0.745	0.827	0.681
236	União Paulista	0.749	0.697	0.863	0.699
236	Terra Roxa	0.749	0.732	0.838	0.684
236	Campos do Jordão	0.749	0.761	0.852	0.648
236	Carapicuíba	0.749	0.721	0.842	0.693
236	Embu-Guaçu	0.749	0.713	0.834	0.708
236	Ipuã	0.749	0.759	0.848	0.654
236	Oscar Bressane	0.749	0.713	0.823	0.715
236	Rio Grande da Serra	0.749	0.684	0.823	0.745
236	Peruíbe	0.749	0.730	0.854	0.675
236	Pirajuí	0.749	0.734	0.853	0.672
248	Taquaritinga	0.748	0.727	0.827	0.696
248	Tanabi	0.748	0.735	0.829	0.687
248	São João de Iracema	0.748	0.682	0.833	0.738
248	Duartina	0.748	0.716	0.837	0.698
252	Ribeirão do Sul	0.747	0.753	0.818	0.676
252	Elisiário	0.747	0.711	0.825	0.712
252	Floreal	0.747	0.710	0.808	0.726
252	Ibitinga	0.747	0.738	0.846	0.726
252	Sud Mennucci	0.747	0.743	0.809	0.694
252	General Salgado	0.747	0.734	0.808	0.702
252	Potirendaba	0.747	0.737	0.857	0.661
252	Cândido Mota	0.747	0.701	0.845	0.704
260	Borá	0.746	0.712	0.863	0.675
260	Bady Bassitt	0.746	0.737	0.805	0.701
260	Palmital	0.746	0.727	0.814	0.702
260	Urânia	0.746	0.727	0.804	0.709
260	Nuporanga	0.746	0.730	0.866	0.656
265	Echaporã	0.745	0.719	0.834	0.690
265	Urupês	0.745	0.741	0.817	0.683
265	Rafard	0.745	0.722	0.823	0.696
265	Itanhaém	0.745	0.716	0.823	0.701
265	Agudos	0.745	0.705	0.845	0.694
265	Américo de Campos	0.745	0.715	0.817	0.708
265	Iacanga	0.745	0.721	0.851	0.675
265	Águas de Lindóia	0.745	0.725	0.846	0.675
265	Junqueirópolis	0.745	0.727	0.860	0.662
274	Mendonça	0.744	0.720	0.863	0.663
274	Vista Alegre do Alto	0.744	0.726	0.840	0.676
274	Dumont	0.744	0.720	0.849	0.674
274	Arealva	0.744	0.718	0.840	0.683
274	Itápolis	0.744	0.738	0.836	0.667
274	Torrinha	0.744	0.734	0.852	0.658
274	Bento de Abreu	0.744	0.706	0.820	0.712
274	Leme	0.744	0.729	0.851	0.665
274	São Manuel	0.744	0.735	0.805	0.695
283	Mira Estrela	0.743	0.697	0.806	0.731
283	Promissão	0.743	0.724	0.850	0.666
283	Guatapará	0.743	0.724	0.822	0.688
283	Santa Cruz da Esperança	0.743	0.719	0.832	0.686
283	Nova Luzitânia	0.743	0.705	0.808	0.719
283	Macaubal	0.743	0.720	0.844	0.676
283	Mairinque	0.743	0.721	0.831	0.684
290	Lindóia	0.742	0.722	0.864	0.654
290	Bocaina	0.742	0.741	0.840	0.656
290	Cafelândia	0.742	0.714	0.867	0.661
290	Itapecerica da Serra	0.742	0.699	0.852	0.687
290	Pedranópolis	0.742	0.698	0.854	0.684
290	Dolcinópolis	0.742	0.699	0.825	0.709
290	Lourdes	0.742	0.697	0.816	0.717
297	Monte Castelo	0.741	0.706	0.814	0.709
297	Jumirim	0.741	0.721	0.863	0.655
297	Miguelópolis	0.741	0.712	0.863	0.661
297	João Ramalho	0.741	0.701	0.818	0.710
297	Anhumas	0.741	0.683	0.845	0.706
297	Teodoro Sampaio	0.741	0.699	0.856	0.679
297	Dirce Reis	0.741	0.686	0.842	0.704
297	Alfredo Marcondes	0.741	0.682	0.840	0.710
297	Motuca	0.741	0.685	0.859	0.691
306	Estiva Gerbi	0.740	0.716	0.815	0.695
306	Brotas	0.740	0.724	0.815	0.688
306	Santópolis do Aguapeí	0.740	0.680	0.830	0.719
306	Macedônia	0.740	0.705	0.852	0.675
306	Ibirá	0.740	0.741	0.841	0.650
306	Rifaina	0.740	0.713	0.824	0.690
306	Estrela do Norte	0.740	0.693	0.818	0.714
306	Aramina	0.740	0.723	0.856	0.656
314	Pederneiras	0.739	0.738	0.812	0.673
314	Guaiçara	0.739	0.697	0.853	0.679
314	Santa Mercedes	0.739	0.683	0.847	0.699
314	Piracaia	0.739	0.758	0.851	0.625
314	Manduri	0.739	0.730	0.818	0.675
314	Nova Granada	0.739	0.727	0.818	0.680
314	Viradouro	0.739	0.717	0.823	0.683
321	Quatá	0.738	0.706	0.814	0.700
321	Nova Aliança	0.738	0.710	0.826	0.684
321	Santa Isabel	0.738	0.700	0.834	0.689
321	Dourado	0.738	0.718	0.811	0.689
321	Cabreúva	0.738	0.717	0.828	0.678
321	Ferraz de Vasconcelos	0.738	0.691	0.828	0.703
321	Onda Verde	0.738	0.693	0.863	0.671
321	Santa Ernestina	0.738	0.716	0.802	0.699
321	Mirassolândia	0.738	0.704	0.829	0.690
330	Vargem Grande do Sul	0.737	0.721	0.863	0.643
330	Pindorama	0.737	0.726	0.842	0.654
330	Santa Gertrudes	0.737	0.723	0.847	0.654
330	Roseira	0.737	0.691	0.823	0.704
330	Cubatão	0.737	0.716	0.821	0.681
330	Santa Lúcia	0.737	0.696	0.818	0.703
330	Parapuã	0.737	0.693	0.830	0.696
330	Guaraci	0.737	0.698	0.840	0.682
330	Braúna	0.737	0.725	0.830	0.664
339	Pariquera-Açu	0.736	0.682	0.862	0.678
339	Iepê	0.736	0.700	0.814	0.700
339	Conchas	0.736	0.725	0.837	0.658
339	Charqueada	0.736	0.720	0.820	0.675
339	Turmalina	0.736	0.724	0.817	0.675
339	Pereiras	0.736	0.717	0.873	0.637
345	Itapevi	0.735	0.687	0.855	0.677
345	Santa Branca	0.735	0.706	0.828	0.678
345	Glicério	0.735	0.735	0.858	0.630
345	Embu das Artes	0.735	0.700	0.839	0.676
345	Aspásia	0.735	0.699	0.864	0.657
345	Nova Independência	0.735	0.675	0.827	0.711
345	Tabapuã	0.735	0.726	0.820	0.666
345	Jardinópolis	0.735	0.728	0.853	0.640
345	Buritizal	0.735	0.743	0.830	0.643
345	Presidente Alves	0.735	0.711	0.811	0.689
345	Valentim Gentil	0.735	0.708	0.810	0.692
356	Cássia dos Coqueiros	0.734	0.680	0.864	0.673
356	Cristais Paulista	0.734	0.682	0.802	0.682
356	Divinolândia	0.734	0.720	0.850	0.645
356	Cajobi	0.734	0.714	0.822	0.674
356	Rincão	0.734	0.701	0.826	0.682
356	Bernardino de Campos	0.734	0.713	0.838	0.662
362	Lucianópolis	0.733	0.736	0.809	0.662
362	Jarinu	0.733	0.723	0.826	0.659
362	Ariranha	0.733	0.730	0.813	0.663
362	Santa Clara d'Oeste	0.733	0.712	0.804	0.687
362	Monte Mor	0.733	0.713	0.863	0.639
362	Bananal	0.733	0.693	0.872	0.653
362	Pradópolis	0.733	0.738	0.822	0.650
362	Iacri	0.733	0.701	0.822	0.655
370	Itapeva	0.732	0.702	0.803	0.697
370	Paranapuã	0.732	0.712	0.842	0.655
370	Fartura	0.732	0.699	0.867	0.648
370	Palestina	0.732	0.717	0.848	0.645
370	Santo Expedito	0.732	0.664	0.828	0.714
370	Salesópolis	0.732	0.687	0.829	0.690
370	Quintana	0.732	0.689	0.811	0.703
370	Guarani d'Oeste	0.732	0.682	0.806	0.714
370	Piacatu	0.732	0.681	0.843	0.684
370	Pontes Gestal	0.732	0.705	0.805	0.690
370	Engenheiro Coelho	0.732	0.720	0.815	0.668
381	Tambaú	0.731	0.729	0.858	0.624
381	Castilho	0.731	0.688	0.827	0.686
381	Marinópolis	0.731	0.681	0.825	0.694
381	Guararema	0.731	0.729	0.817	0.656
381	Meridiano	0.731	0.717	0.817	0.667
381	Luís Antônio	0.731	0.709	0.822	0.671
381	Franco da Rocha	0.731	0.702	0.852	0.654
388	Altinópolis	0.730	0.726	0.843	0.635
388	Casa Branca	0.730	0.727	0.835	0.640
388	Mineiros do Tietê	0.730	0.719	0.823	0.658
388	Sagres	0.730	0.692	0.830	0.677
388	Embaúba	0.730	0.723	0.840	0.641
388	Óleo	0.730	0.713	0.858	0.637
388	Borborema	0.730	0.710	0.831	0.658
388	Bertioga	0.730	0.727	0.817	0.654
388	Patrocínio Paulista	0.730	0.696	0.826	0.678
388	Adolfo	0.730	0.710	0.844	0.648
388	Itajobi	0.730	0.727	0.832	0.644
388	Ipiguá	0.730	0.696	0.839	0.666
400	Lavrinhas	0.729	0.665	0.823	0.707
400	Cerqueira César	0.729	0.710	0.821	0.666
400	Serrana	0.729	0.713	0.835	0.650
400	Salto de Pirapora	0.729	0.699	0.834	0.665
400	Laranjal Paulista	0.729	0.732	0.829	0.639
400	Socorro	0.729	0.737	0.828	0.634
400	Caiabu	0.729	0.682	0.823	0.691
400	Zacarias	0.729	0.695	0.826	0.674
400	Chavantes	0.729	0.713	0.828	0.655
409	Álvares Florence	0.728	0.701	0.806	0.683
409	Cajamar	0.728	0.713	0.810	0.668
409	São Lourenço da Serra	0.728	0.704	0.823	0.666
409	Reginópolis	0.728	0.715	0.817	0.660
409	Santa Albertina	0.728	0.716	0.809	0.665
409	Tuiuti	0.728	0.702	0.871	0.630
409	Guaimbê	0.728	0.675	0.830	0.689
409	Sabino	0.728	0.708	0.813	0.671
409	Santa Cruz das Palmeiras	0.728	0.746	0.815	0.635
418	Ubirajara	0.727	0.689	0.829	0.674
418	Pirapora do Bom Jesus	0.727	0.679	0.810	0.698
418	Herculândia	0.727	0.680	0.809	0.698
418	Flora Rica	0.727	0.668	0.796	0.723
418	Emilianópolis	0.727	0.690	0.805	0.691
418	Igaraçu do Tietê	0.727	0.691	0.838	0.664
418	Ipaussu	0.727	0.713	0.828	0.650
418	Pardinho	0.727	0.718	0.821	0.652
426	Nova Guataporanga	0.726	0.707	0.842	0.644
426	Tarabai	0.726	0.666	0.823	0.697
426	Murutinga do Sul	0.726	0.703	0.847	0.643
426	Iguape	0.726	0.691	0.847	0.653
430	Clementina	0.725	0.704	0.821	0.660
430	Barrinha	0.725	0.711	0.829	0.646
430	Paulo de Faria	0.725	0.721	0.800	0.662
430	Valparaíso	0.725	0.719	0.825	0.643
430	Ilha Comprida	0.725	0.696	0.821	0.660
430	Guapiaçu	0.725	0.728	0.866	0.605
430	Dois Córregos	0.725	0.725	0.853	0.616
430	Pinhalzinho	0.725	0.707	0.808	0.666
430	Itapuí	0.725	0.716	0.841	0.633
430	Vitória Brasil	0.725	0.686	0.811	0.685
430	Pontal	0.725	0.718	0.838	0.633
430	Pacaembu	0.725	0.717	0.843	0.631
442	Lupércio	0.724	0.679	0.830	0.674
442	Mesópolis	0.724	0.674	0.847	0.666
442	Itirapina	0.724	0.734	0.813	0.636
442	Mirante do Paranapanema	0.724	0.670	0.841	0.674
446	Pitangueiras	0.723	0.699	0.830	0.651
446	Taciba	0.723	0.682	0.809	0.684
446	Jaci	0.723	0.700	0.818	0.659
446	Gastão Vidigal	0.723	0.727	0.817	0.635
446	São Sebastião da Grama	0.723	0.699	0.820	0.724
446	Rinópolis	0.723	0.696	0.843	0.644
446	São Francisco	0.723	0.705	0.814	0.658
452	Trabiju	0.722	0.666	0.811	0.697
452	Arco-Íris	0.722	0.671	0.809	0.694
452	Cosmorama	0.722	0.705	0.849	0.630
452	Alvinlândia	0.722	0.721	0.791	0.659
452	Palmares Paulista	0.722	0.698	0.837	0.645
452	Queluz	0.722	0.665	0.823	0.687
452	Cardoso	0.722	0.695	0.853	0.636
452	Panorama	0.722	0.695	0.853	0.636
460	Ribeirão dos Índios	0.721	0.661	0.809	0.701
460	Anhembi	0.721	0.681	0.863	0.637
460	Aparecida d'Oeste	0.721	0.697	0.804	0.670
460	Capão Bonito	0.721	0.675	0.826	0.671
460	Lavínia	0.721	0.698	0.820	0.655
460	Martinópolis	0.721	0.703	0.832	0.641
460	Parisi	0.721	0.720	0.842	0.619
460	Rubiácea	0.721	0.684	0.820	0.668
460	Uchoa	0.721	0.708	0.823	0.644
469	Itapura	0.720	0.682	0.813	0.673
469	Lutécia	0.720	0.670	0.846	0.659
469	Icém	0.720	0.716	0.806	0.646
469	Caconde	0.720	0.701	0.858	0.620
469	São João das Duas Pontes	0.720	0.675	0.806	0.686
469	Cananéia	0.720	0.677	0.806	0.649
469	São Bento do Sapucaí	0.720	0.719	0.812	0.638
476	Gavião Peixoto	0.719	0.687	0.802	0.676
476	Mombuca	0.719	0.746	0.820	0.607
476	Guaraçaí	0.719	0.699	0.803	0.663
476	Guariba	0.719	0.712	0.811	0.645
476	Novais	0.719	0.712	0.822	0.634
476	Iperó	0.719	0.680	0.814	0.672
476	Angatuba	0.719	0.693	0.827	0.648
476	Itaporanga	0.719	0.681	0.835	0.653
476	Paraibuna	0.719	0.709	0.815	0.642
476	Coroados	0.719	0.704	0.816	0.648
476	Platina	0.719	0.691	0.824	0.652
476	Planalto	0.719	0.683	0.853	0.639
476	Salmourão	0.719	0.678	0.846	0.649
489	Mariápolis	0.718	0.684	0.830	0.651
489	Narandiba	0.718	0.659	0.839	0.670
489	Dobrada	0.718	0.691	0.818	0.655
489	Guará	0.718	0.710	0.826	0.630
489	Paulistânia	0.718	0.683	0.817	0.663
494	Paranapanema	0.717	0.697	0.839	0.631
494	Itobi	0.717	0.697	0.820	0.646
494	Jacupiranga	0.717	0.687	0.832	0.644
494	Ocauçu	0.717	0.679	0.830	0.653
494	Getulina	0.717	0.696	0.813	0.652
494	Campina do Monte Alegre	0.717	0.687	0.846	0.634
500	Piedade	0.716	0.694	0.848	0.624
500	Júlio Mesquita	0.716	0.659	0.813	0.686
502	Severínia	0.715	0.709	0.807	0.638
502	Queiroz	0.715	0.662	0.811	0.681
502	Pedregulho	0.715	0.716	0.820	0.623
502	Nova Canaã Paulista	0.715	0.673	0.806	0.623
502	Morungaba	0.715	0.726	0.802	0.627
502	Flórida Paulista	0.715	0.702	0.807	0.646
502	Aguaí	0.715	0.703	0.858	0.606
509	Santo Antônio do Jardim	0.714	0.703	0.835	0.620
509	Itaquaquecetuba	0.714	0.665	0.844	0.648
509	Torre de Pedra	0.714	0.679	0.829	0.647
509	Nantes	0.714	0.655	0.790	0.702
509	Avaí	0.714	0.674	0.830	0.650
509	Populina	0.714	0.699	0.804	0.647
515	Florínia	0.713	0.678	0.820	0.652
515	Guarantã	0.713	0.698	0.832	0.623
515	Nipoã	0.713	0.701	0.814	0.636
515	Cajuru	0.713	0.693	0.825	0.633
515	Irapuã	0.713	0.688	0.844	0.624
515	Bom Jesus dos Perdões	0.713	0.716	0.802	0.631
515	Itaí	0.713	0.692	0.830	0.630
522	Alambari	0.712	0.682	0.805	0.658
522	Ribeirão Bonito	0.712	0.712	0.811	0.625
522	Morro Agudo	0.712	0.716	0.836	0.604
522	Biritiba Mirim	0.712	0.710	0.795	0.640
522	Irapuru	0.712	0.691	0.839	0.622
522	Uru	0.712	0.678	0.832	0.639
528	Piquerobi	0.711	0.669	0.836	0.644
528	Jaborandi	0.711	0.679	0.845	0.627
528	Barão de Antonina	0.711	0.676	0.820	0.649
528	Paulicéia	0.711	0.692	0.811	0.640
528	Igaratá	0.711	0.683	0.855	0.616
528	Ribeirão Corrente	0.711	0.688	0.814	0.642
534	Ibiúna	0.710	0.700	0.832	0.614
534	Colômbia	0.710	0.689	0.802	0.647
534	Monteiro Lobato	0.710	0.692	0.826	0.627
534	São Miguel Arcanjo	0.710	0.708	0.799	0.633
534	Apiaí	0.710	0.662	0.835	0.647
534	Timburi	0.710	0.688	0.826	0.629
534	Brejo Alegre	0.710	0.702	0.826	0.618
534	Taiaçu	0.710	0.701	0.814	0.628
542	Taguaí	0.709	0.690	0.818	0.631
542	Gália	0.709	0.684	0.823	0.634
542	Juquitiba	0.709	0.680	0.791	0.662
542	Sandovalina	0.709	0.665	0.812	0.659
546	Ibirarema	0.708	0.692	0.817	0.628
546	Conchal	0.708	0.699	0.827	0.614
548	Sarapuí	0.707	0.699	0.814	0.621
550	Campos Novos Paulista	0.706	0.670	0.824	0.638
550	Itatinga	0.706	0.685	0.841	0.610
550	Cesário Lange	0.706	0.715	0.804	0.611
550	Santo Antônio do Pinhal	0.706	0.685	0.812	0.632
554	Borebi	0.705	0.674	0.846	0.615
554	Bofete	0.705	0.700	0.821	0.609
554	Itaju	0.705	0.696	0.823	0.613
554	Restinga	0.705	0.664	0.826	0.639
554	Avanhandava	0.705	0.688	0.817	0.623
554	Ribeirão Grande	0.705	0.643	0.807	0.676
560	Euclides da Cunha Paulista	0.704	0.663	0.802	0.655
560	Araçariguama	0.704	0.717	0.814	0.597
560	Tabatinga	0.704	0.700	0.818	0.609
560	Canas	0.704	0.646	0.797	0.677
560	Salto Grande	0.704	0.664	0.825	0.637
565	Iporanga	0.703	0.637	0.816	0.668
565	Itararé	0.703	0.668	0.803	0.649
565	Porangaba	0.703	0.696	0.864	0.578
565	São Pedro do Turvo	0.703	0.661	0.826	0.636
565	Fernão	0.703	0.668	0.843	0.617
565	Jeriquara	0.703	0.680	0.814	0.628
565	Riolândia	0.703	0.677	0.817	0.629
565	Francisco Morato	0.703	0.659	0.815	0.647
565	Ibaté	0.703	0.681	0.814	0.627
574	Santo Antônio de Posse	0.702	0.718	0.838	0.576
574	Pontalinda	0.702	0.677	0.847	0.604
574	Santo Antônio da Alegria	0.702	0.690	0.830	0.604
574	Luiziânia	0.702	0.682	0.815	0.623
578	Taquarituba	0.701	0.700	0.811	0.606
578	Pratânia	0.701	0.681	0.798	0.633
581	Ubarana	0.700	0.672	0.844	0.604
581	Juquiá	0.700	0.654	0.823	0.637
581	Alto Alegre	0.700	0.683	0.817	0.616
Medium HDI
584	Barbosa	0.699	0.676	0.843	0.599
584	Joanópolis	0.699	0.707	0.824	0.585
584	Suzanápolis	0.699	0.665	0.813	0.631
584	Capela do Alto	0.699	0.673	0.823	0.617
584	Vargem	0.699	0.690	0.839	0.591
589	Ribeira	0.698	0.635	0.797	0.673
590	São Luís do Paraitinga	0.697	0.691	0.826	0.593
590	Guzolândia	0.697	0.676	0.808	0.621
590	Areias	0.697	0.627	0.803	0.672
590	Caiuá	0.697	0.665	0.802	0.635
590	Miracatu	0.697	0.645	0.803	0.653
590	Potim	0.697	0.651	0.806	0.646
596	Espírito Santo do Turvo	0.696	0.675	0.819	0.609
596	Pedro de Toledo	0.696	0.654	0.812	0.634
596	Pracinha	0.696	0.658	0.814	0.629
599	Elias Fausto	0.695	0.701	0.822	0.583
599	Areiópolis	0.695	0.686	0.823	0.594
601	Cajati	0.694	0.658	0.832	0.611
601	Cabrália Paulista	0.694	0.667	0.811	0.619
603	Itaberá	0.693	0.652	0.803	0.636
603	Lagoinha	0.693	0.686	0.797	0.609
603	São José da Bela Vista	0.693	0.679	0.844	0.580
606	Ouro Verde	0.692	0.666	0.814	0.612
607	Eldorado	0.691	0.633	0.847	0.615
608	Pilar do Sul	0.690	0.674	0.820	0.594
608	Coronel Macedo	0.690	0.653	0.811	0.619
610	Sarutaiá	0.688	0.679	0.794	0.603
610	Álvaro de Carvalho	0.688	0.669	0.805	0.605
612	Guareí	0.687	0.692	0.805	0.583
612	Altair	0.687	0.698	0.800	0.581
614	Santa Maria da Serra	0.686	0.688	0.820	0.571
614	Serra Azul	0.686	0.697	0.810	0.572
616	Arandu	0.685	0.675	0.806	0.592
617	São José do Barreiro	0.684	0.666	0.813	0.591
617	Cunha	0.684	0.672	0.826	0.576
619	Tapiraí	0.681	0.647	0.846	0.578
619	Boa Esperança do Sul	0.681	0.692	0.811	0.562
621	Arapeí	0.680	0.634	0.812	0.612
621	Canitar	0.680	0.658	0.791	0.605
621	Itaóca	0.680	0.627	0.787	0.637
624	Taquarivaí	0.679	0.617	0.811	0.626
625	Quadra	0.678	0.700	0.822	0.541
625	Nazaré Paulista	0.678	0.681	0.818	0.559
625	Silveiras	0.678	0.657	0.812	0.584
628	Itariri	0.677	0.642	0.837	0.577
628	Pedra Bela	0.677	0.671	0.796	0.581
628	Marabá Paulista	0.677	0.650	0.809	0.591
631	Guapiara	0.675	0.634	0.806	0.602
632	Iaras	0.674	0.664	0.848	0.543
633	Sete Barras	0.673	0.651	0.832	0.562
634	Balbinos	0.669	0.690	0.809	0.537
635	Tejupá	0.668	0.668	0.794	0.563
636	Buri	0.667	0.642	0.799	0.578
637	Riversul	0.664	0.634	0.799	0.577
638	Itapirapuã Paulista	0.661	0.595	0.816	0.594
639	Bom Sucesso de Itararé	0.660	0.605	0.775	0.613
639	Barra do Chapéu	0.660	0.617	0.779	0.599
640	Redenção da Serra	0.657	0.633	0.799	0.560
642	Natividade da Serra	0.655	0.664	0.814	0.520
643	Nova Campina	0.651	0.598	0.799	0.577
644	Barra do Turvo	0.641	0.625	0.792	0.532
645	Ribeirão Branco	0.639	0.592	0.797	0.553
Low HDI
no municipality
Very low HDI
no municipality

== See also ==
- Geography of Brazil
- List of cities in Brazil
