= Microregion of Auriflama =

- Microregion
- Location of the Microregion of Auriflama
- Coordinates: 20°41′09″S 50°33′18″W
- Country: Brazil
- Region: Southeast
- State: São Paulo
- Mesoregion: São José do Rio Preto

Area
  - Total: 2,312.2 km^{2} (892.7 sq mi)

Population (2010/IBGE)
  - Total: 46,367
  - Density: 20.053/km^{2} (51.938/sq mi)
- Time zone: UTC-3 (UTC-3)
  - Summer (DST): UTC-2 (UTC-2)
- Postal Code: 15350-000
- Area code: +55 17

The Microregion of Auriflama (Portuguese: Microrregião de Auriflama) is located on the northwest of São Paulo state, Brazil, and is made up of 9 municipalities. It belongs to the Mesoregion of São José do Rio Preto.

The microregion has a population of 46,367 inhabitants, in an area of 2,312.2 km^{2}

== Municipalities ==
The microregion consists of the following municipalities, listed below with their 2010 Census populations (IBGE/2010):

- Auriflama: 14,202
- Floreal: 3,003
- Gastão Vidigal: 4,193
- General Salgado: 10,699
- Guzolândia: 4,754
- Magda: 3,200
- Nova Castilho: 1,125
- Nova Luzitânia: 3,441
- São João de Iracema: 1,780
