= Microregion of Nhandeara =

- Microregion
- Location of the Microregion of Nhandeara
- Coordinates: 20°41′38″S 50°02′16″W
- Country: Brazil
- Region: Southeast
- State: São Paulo
- Mesoregion: São José do Rio Preto

Area
  - Total: 2,016.7 km^{2} (778.7 sq mi)

Population (2010/IBGE)
  - Total: 65,337
  - Density: 32.398/km^{2} (83.910/sq mi)
- Time zone: UTC-3 (UTC-3)
  - Summer (DST): UTC-2 (UTC-2)
- Postal Code: 15190-000
- Area code: +55 17

The Microregion of Nhandeara (Portuguese: Microrregião de Nhandeara) is located on the northwest of São Paulo state, Brazil, and is made up of 9 municipalities. It belongs to the Mesoregion of São José do Rio Preto.

The microregion has a population of 65,337 inhabitants, in an area of 2,016.7 km²

== Municipalities ==
The microregion consists of the following municipalities, listed below with their 2010 Census populations (IBGE/2010):

- Macaubal: 7,663
- Monções: 2,132
- Monte Aprazível: 21,746
- Neves Paulista: 8,772
- Nhandeara: 10,725
- Nipoã: 4,274
- Poloni: 5,395
- Sebastianópolis do Sul: 3,031
- União Paulista: 1,599

== See also ==
- Interior of São Paulo
