= Meridiano =

Meridiano (in English, meridian) may refer to

- Meridiano, São Paulo
- Diario Meridiano, a Venezuelan sports newspaper
- Meridiano Televisión, a Venezuelan sports network
