= Itobi =

- Municipality
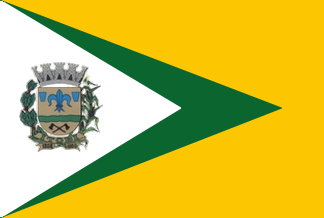
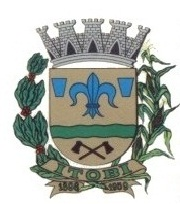
- Flag Coat of arms

- Location in São Paulo state

- Location in Brazil
- Coordinates: 21°44′13″S 46°58′30″W
- Country: Brazil
- Region: Southeast
- State: São Paulo

Area
  - Total: 139 km^{2} (54 sq mi)

Population (2020)
  - Total: 7,852
  - Density: 56.5/km^{2} (146/sq mi)
- Time zone: UTC−3 (BRT)

Itobi is a municipality in the state of São Paulo in Brazil. The population is 8,210 (2024 est.) in an area of 139 km^{2}. Its elevation is 658m. The name Itobi is derived from the Tupi–Guarani, and means "green river". The town was initially called Vila Nova do Rio Verde but was renamed Itobi in 1898. It became an independent municipality in 1959, when it was separated from Casa Branca.

== History ==
In 1828, the region — then part of Casa Branca — was occupied by the Cocais do Rio Verde, Boa Vista de Água Suja, and Boa Vista do Rio Doce farms. On August 27, 1887, the Rio Pardo Branch Railway Company began operations, connecting Casa Branca to São José do Rio Pardo; the railway's Rio Doce station served the area. That same year, the settlement was named Vila Nova do Rio Verde. In 1894, the settlement was designated a police district. In 1897, it became part of the municipality of São José do Rio Pardo. The following year, it returned to the jurisdiction of Casa Branca and adopted its current name, "Itobi." It gained autonomy in 1959, separating from the municipality of Casa Branca. The key figure behind Itobi's emancipation was Alcibíades Pires (1917–1977), who guided and led the local population to the successful achievement of emancipation.

After much hard work, the plebiscite yielded an overwhelming result (there were only two "no" votes). Alcibíades Pires—affectionately known as "Seu Bida"—became Itobi's first mayor and was re-elected to the office four years after his first term ended. Early in his first term, he purchased new buses to transport students from Itobi to schools in Casa Branca (at the time, Itobi offered only primary education). Subsequently, Bida founded the Itobi public library, naming it "Alfredo Rodrigues de Souza" in honor of an exemplary employee of the Itobi School Group who had recently passed away.

== Media ==
In telecommunications, the city was served by Telecomunicações de São Paulo. In July 1998, this company was acquired by Telefónica, which adopted the Vivo brand in 2012. The company is currently an operator of cell phones, fixed lines, internet (fiber optics/4G) and television (satellite and cable).

== See also ==
- List of municipalities in São Paulo
