= Motuca =

- Municipality
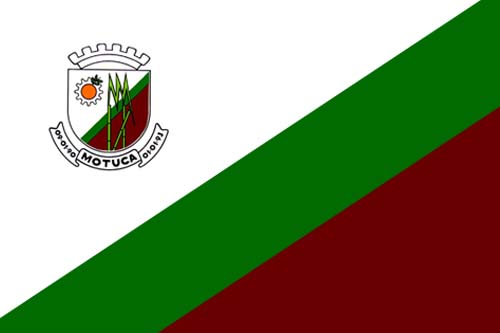
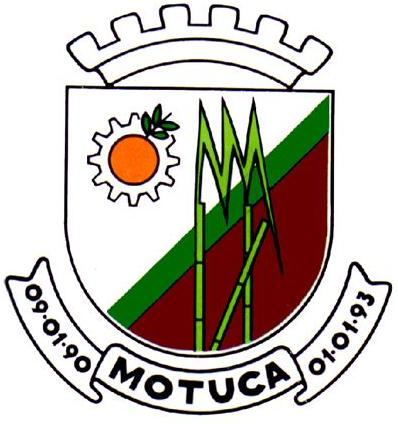
- Flag Coat of arms

- Location in São Paulo state

- Location in Brazil
- Coordinates: 21°30′29″S 48°9′4″W
- Country: Brazil
- Region: Southeast
- State: São Paulo

Area
  - Total: 229 km^{2} (88 sq mi)

Population (2020)
  - Total: 4,795
  - Density: 20.9/km^{2} (54.2/sq mi)
- Time zone: UTC−3 (BRT)

Motuca is a municipality in the state of São Paulo, Brazil. The population is 4,795 (2020 est.) in an area of 229 km^{2}. The elevation is 618 m. The municipality was created on January 20, 1990.

== History ==
The first records of settlement in Motuca date back to 1892, with the construction of the Rincão/Bebedouro Railway by the Companhia Paulista de Estrada de Ferro.

The area, abundant in water resources, received cattle drivers and their herds from distant regions. The junction of the railway with the cattle trail was natural, as both cattle and coffee were unloaded there. Coffee, after traveling a long way to the port of Santos, was destined for the European market.

Like many other areas in the state of São Paulo, Motuca had its golden period with coffee cultivation and cattle raising. Around 1908, Japanese and Portuguese immigrants settled and developed activities related to horticulture and coffee farming.

The effective agricultural growth spurred political and administrative development, and on December 31, 1925, it became a district of the municipality of Araraquara. After the 1950s, other crops were replaced by sugarcane cultivation, which gradually took over small farms and sites, leasing land and attracting migrants from the northeastern region.

From that period onwards, there was slow economic development, and only on January 9, 1990, did it gain political and administrative autonomy with the creation of the municipality. The municipality's name comes from a type of fly of the same name, common in the region due to the large amount of water there.

== Football ==
Founded on January 5, 1971, Motuca Futebol Clube is the main local football club.

== Geography ==
Motuca has an area of 228.7 km².

== Demography ==
Data from the 2010 Census:

Total Population: 4,290

- Urban: 3,108
- Rural: 1,182
- Men: 2,162
- Women: 2,128
- Population Density (inhabitants/km²): 18.76

== Hydrography ==
- Mojiguaçu River

== Highways ==
- SP-326

== Media ==
In telecommunications, the city was served by Telecomunicações de São Paulo. In July 1998, this company was acquired by Telefónica, which adopted the Vivo brand in 2012. The company is currently an operator of cell phones, fixed lines, internet (fiber optics/4G) and television (satellite and cable).

== Administration ==
- Mayor: João Ricardo Fascineli (PT)
- Vice-Mayor: Maria do Carmo Mendes de Oliveira (PRB)
- President of the Council: Gabriel Muniz da Silva (SD)

== Catholic Church ==
The municipality belongs to the Diocese of São Carlos.

== See also ==
- List of municipalities in São Paulo
- Interior of São Paulo
