= Ribeirão dos Índios =

- Municipality
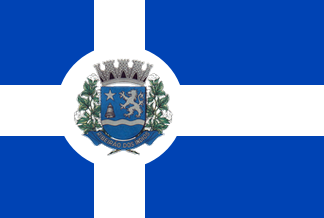
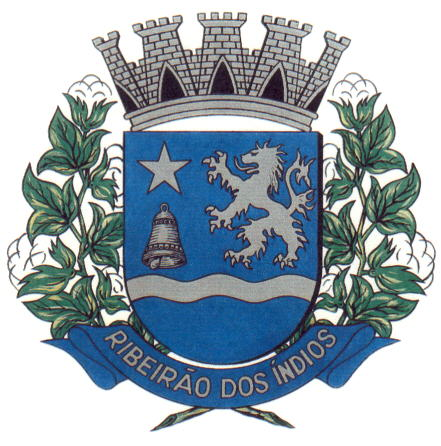
- Flag Coat of arms

- Location in São Paulo state

- Location in Brazil
- Coordinates: 21°58′33″S 51°39′5″W
- Country: Brazil
- Region: Southeast
- State: São Paulo

Area
  - Total: 196 km^{2} (76 sq mi)

Population (2020)
  - Total: 2,224
  - Density: 11.3/km^{2} (29.4/sq mi)
- Time zone: UTC−3 (BRT)

Ribeirão dos Índios is a municipality in the state of São Paulo in Brazil. The population is 2,025 as of 2022 in an area of 196 km^{2}.

== Demography ==
=== Demographics ===
Historical population (municipality)
Year	Population	%±
2000	2,222	—
2010	2,187	−1.6%
2022	2,025	−7.4%

Data from the Census - 2000

Total Population - 2,222

Urban: 1,760

Rural: 462

Men: 1,144

Women: 1,078

Population Density (inhabitants/km2): 11.28

Infant Mortality (up to 1 year old per 1000): 14.48

Life Expectation: 71.98

Fertility rate (children per women): 2.06

Literacy Rate: 84.27%

== Administration ==
- Mayor - Jose Amauri Lenzoni (2005-2008)
- President of the Board - Aparecido de Almeida (2007-2008)

== Media ==
In telecommunications, the city was served by Telecomunicações de São Paulo. In July 1998, this company was acquired by Telefónica, which adopted the Vivo brand in 2012. The company is currently an operator of cell phones, fixed lines, internet (fiber optics/4G) and television (satellite and cable).

== Religion ==
Christianity is present in the city as follows:

=== Catholic Church ===
The Catholic church in the municipality is part of the Roman Catholic Diocese of Presidente Prudente.

=== Protestant Church ===
The most diverse evangelical beliefs are present in the city, mainly Pentecostal, including the Assemblies of God in Brazil (the largest evangelical church in the country), Christian Congregation in Brazil, among others. These denominations are growing more and more throughout Brazil.

== See also ==
- List of municipalities in São Paulo
