= Guaimbê =

- Municipality
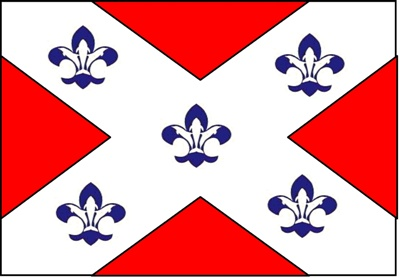
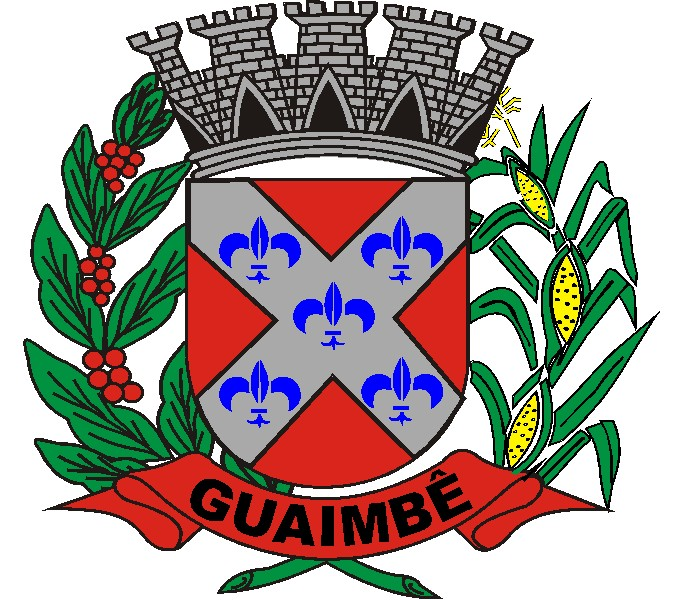
- Flag Coat of arms

- Location in São Paulo state

- Location in Brazil
- Coordinates: 21°54′36″S 49°53′48″W
- Country: Brazil
- Region: Southeast
- State: São Paulo

Area
  - Total: 218 km^{2} (84 sq mi)

Population (2020)
  - Total: 5,785
  - Density: 26.5/km^{2} (68.7/sq mi)
- Time zone: UTC−3 (BRT)

Guaimbê is a municipality in the state of São Paulo in Brazil. It is located near the cities of Lins and Araçatuba. It was founded in 1953. The population is 5,785 (2020 est.) in an area of 218 km^{2}. Its altitude is 469 m.

Guaimbê or guaibê is also a plant (Philodendron bipinnatifidum) which has a sweet fruit which was very much appreciated by the Guarani Indians. The location was probably named after the plant.

== Media ==
In telecommunications, the city was served by Companhia de Telecomunicações do Estado de São Paulo until 1973, when it began to be served by Telecomunicações de São Paulo. In July 1998, this company was acquired by Telefónica, which adopted the Vivo brand in 2012.

The company is currently an operator of cell phones, fixed lines, internet (fiber optics/4G) and television (satellite and cable).

== See also ==
- List of municipalities in São Paulo
