= Auriflama =

Municipality in the state of São Paulo in Brazil

- Municipality
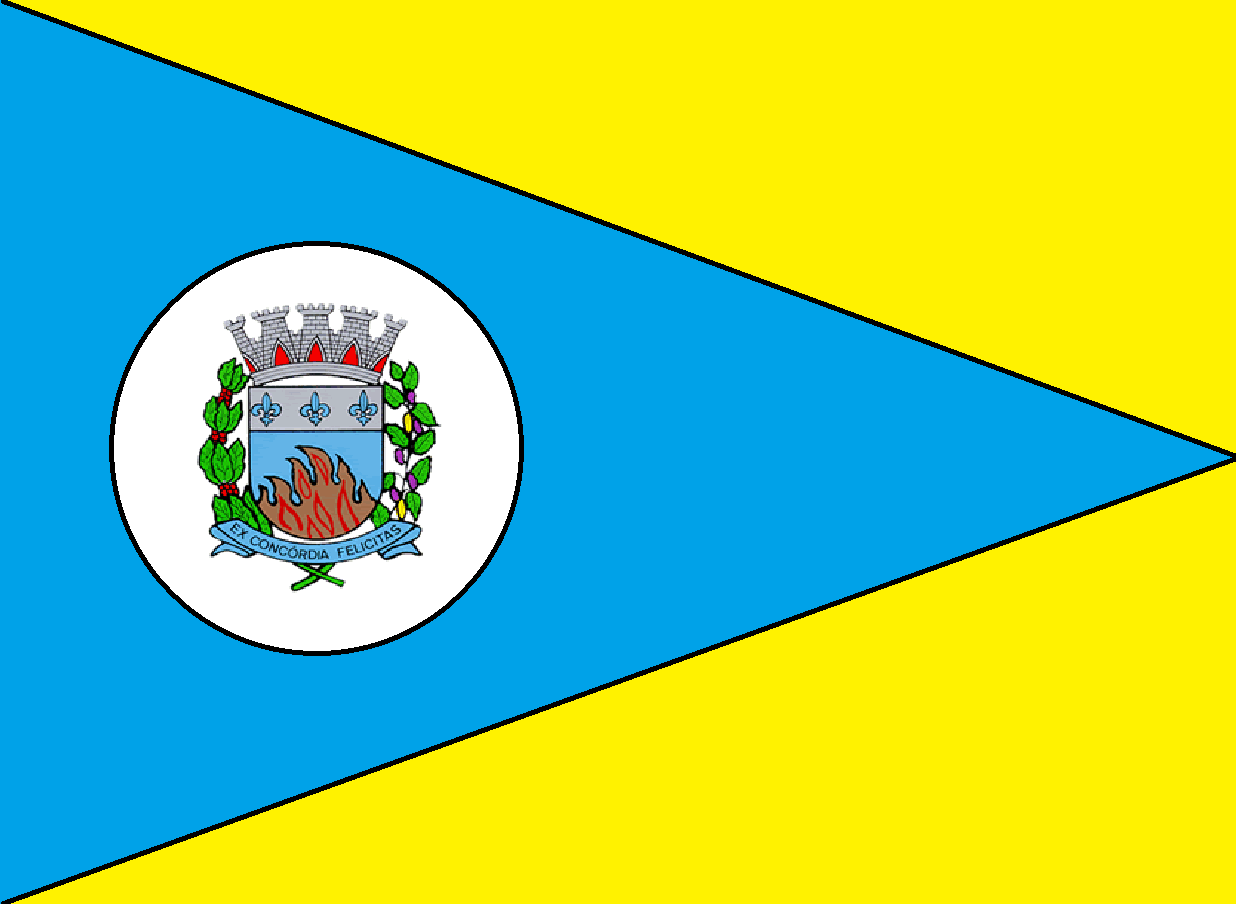
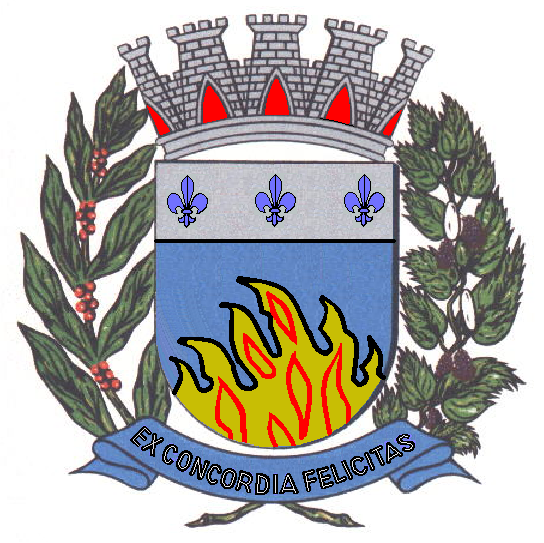
- Flag Coat of arms

- Location in São Paulo state

- Location in Brazil
- Coordinates: 20°41′08″S 50°33′17″W
- Country: Brazil
- Region: Southeast
- State: São Paulo
- Mesoregion: São José do Rio Preto
- Microregion: Auriflama

Government
  - Mayor: Ivanilde Della Roveri Rodrigues

Area
  - Total: 434.3 km^{2} (167.7 sq mi)
- Elevation: 595 m (1,952 ft)

Population (2020)
  - Total: 15,253
  - Density: 35.12/km^{2} (90.96/sq mi)
- Time zone: UTC−3 (BRT)
- Postal code: 15350-000
- Area code: +55 17
- Website: www.auriflama.sp.gov.br

Auriflama is a municipality in the state of São Paulo, Brazil. The population is 15,253 (2020 est.) in an area of 434.3 km^{2}. Auriflama belongs to the Mesoregion of São José do Rio Preto.

== Demographics ==
Historical population (municipality)
| Year | Population | %± |
|---|---|---|
| 1960 | 13,437 | — |
| 1970 | 13,266 | −1.3% |
| 1980 | 12,031 | −9.3% |
| 1991 | 12,765 | 6.1% |
| 2000 | 13,513 | 5.9% |
| 2010 | 14,202 | 5.1% |
| 2022 | 13,692 | −3.6% |

== Economy ==
The Tertiary sector corresponds to 67.83% of Auriflama's GDP. The Primary sector is 9.68% of the GDP and the Industry corresponds to 22.49%.

== Media ==
In telecommunications, the city was served by Companhia de Telecomunicações do Estado de São Paulo until 1975, when it began to be served by Telecomunicações de São Paulo. In July 1998, this company was acquired by Telefónica, which adopted the Vivo brand in 2012.

The company is currently an operator of cell phones, fixed lines, internet (fiber optics/4G) and television (satellite and cable).

== See also ==
- List of municipalities in São Paulo
- Interior of São Paulo
