= Gastão Vidigal =

- Municipality
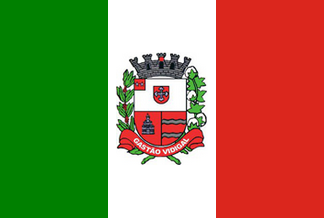
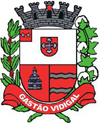
- Flag Coat of arms

- Location in São Paulo state

- Location in Brazil
- Coordinates: 20°48′S 50°10′W
- Country: Brazil
- Region: Southeast
- State: São Paulo

Area
  - Total: 181 km^{2} (70 sq mi)

Population (2020)
  - Total: 4,860
  - Density: 26.9/km^{2} (69.5/sq mi)
- Time zone: UTC−3 (BRT)

Gastão Vidigal is a municipality in the state of São Paulo in Brazil. The population is 4,860 (2020 est.) in an area of 181 km^{2} (70 sq mi). The town was settled in the first part of the 20th century, at first under the name Brioso. The municipality was established in 1955 by separating it from Nhandeara, and at the same time it was renamed Gastão Vidigal after a banker who opened a branch of the Banco Mercantil de São Paulo in the town. The small town produces milk, corn, cotton, and coffee.

== Media ==
In telecommunications, the city was served by Companhia de Telecomunicações do Estado de São Paulo until 1975, when it began to be served by Telecomunicações de São Paulo. In July 1998, this company was acquired by Telefónica, which adopted the Vivo brand in 2012.

The company is currently an operator of cell phones, fixed lines, internet (fiber optics/4G) and television (satellite and cable).

== See also ==
- Interior of São Paulo
