= Nova Castilho =

- Municipality
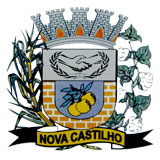
- Flag Coat of arms

- Location in São Paulo state

- Location in Brazil
- Coordinates: 20°45′47″S 50°20′35″W
- Country: Brazil
- Region: Southeast
- State: São Paulo
- Founded: 1923

Area
  - Total: 183 km^{2} (71 sq mi)

Population (2020)
  - Total: 1,278
  - Density: 6.98/km^{2} (18.1/sq mi)
- Time zone: UTC−3 (BRT)

Nova Castilho is a municipality in the state of São Paulo in Brazil. The population is 1,278 (2020 est.) in an area of 183 km^{2}. The elevation is 420 m. Its foundation dates from around 1923, on lands donated by the Castilho family. Previously it also had the names of General Salgado and Japiúba.

== Media ==
In telecommunications, the city was served by Telecomunicações de São Paulo. In July 1998, this company was acquired by Telefónica, which adopted the Vivo brand in 2012. The company is currently an operator of cell phones, fixed lines, internet (fiber optics/4G) and television (satellite and cable).

== See also ==
- List of municipalities in São Paulo
- Interior of São Paulo
