= Casa Branca, São Paulo =

Municipality in the state of São Paulo, Brazil

- Municipality
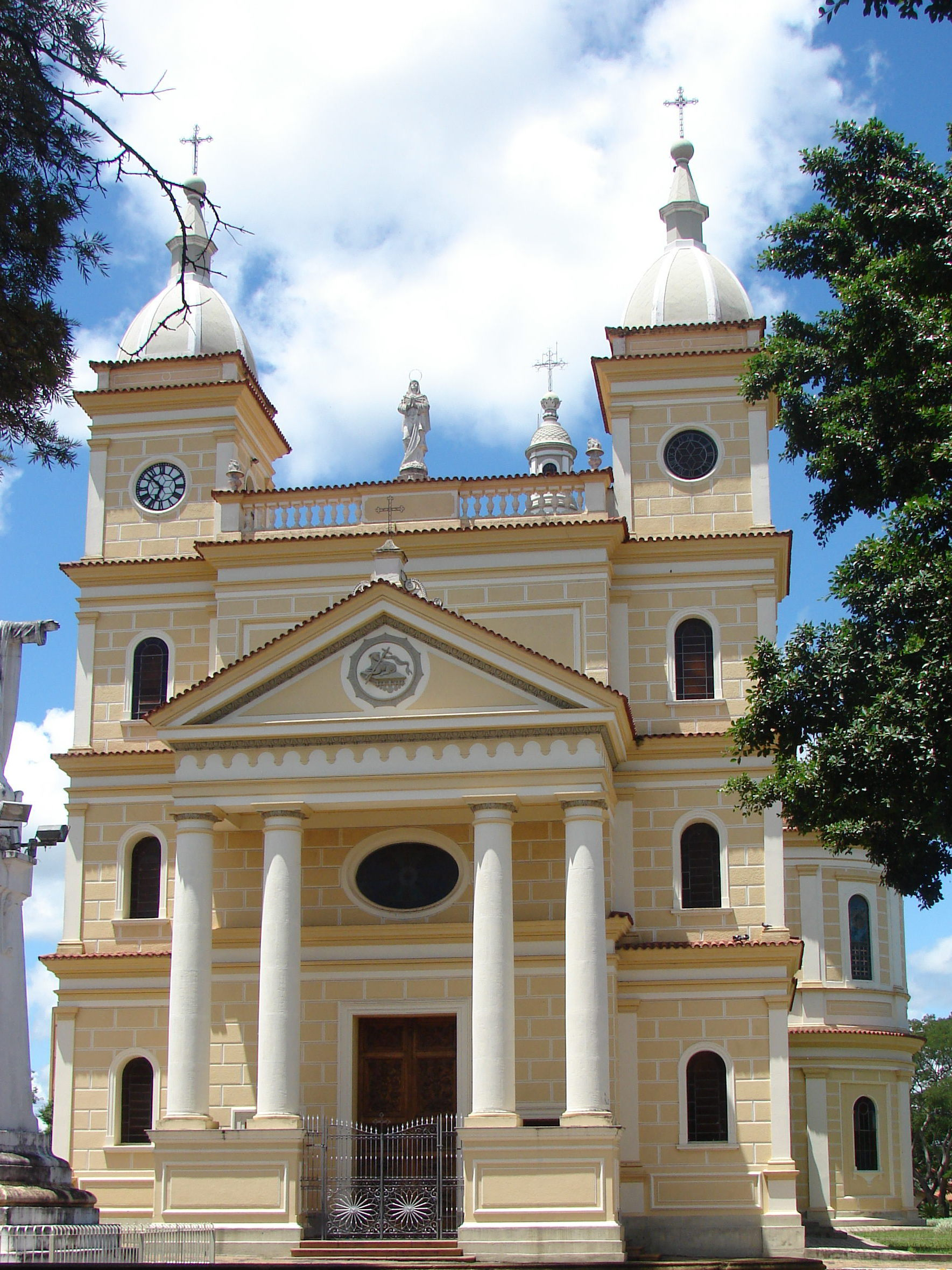

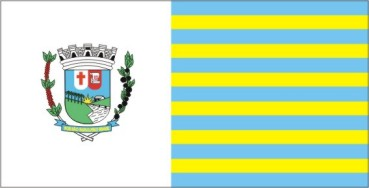
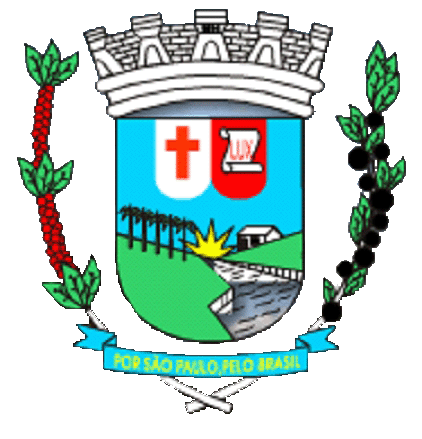
- Flag Coat of arms

- Location in São Paulo state

- Location in Brazil
- Coordinates: 21°46′26″S 47°5′9″W
- Country: Brazil
- Region: Southeast
- State: São Paulo

Area
  - Total: 864 km^{2} (334 sq mi)

Population (2020)
  - Total: 30,520
  - Density: 35.3/km^{2} (91.5/sq mi)
- Time zone: UTC−3 (BRT)

Casa Branca (Portuguese for "White House") is a municipality in the state of São Paulo in Brazil. The population is 30,520 (2020 est.) in an area of 864 km^{2}. It was founded in 1841. Its nickname is "the Jabuticaba capital"

It is known for the jabuticaba festival held in September, when people can purchase a variety of goods made from the fruit

== Media ==
In telecommunications, the city was served by Telecomunicações de São Paulo. In July 1998, this company was acquired by Telefónica, which adopted the Vivo brand in 2012. The company is currently an operator of cell phones, fixed lines, internet (fiber optics/4G) and television (satellite and cable).

== See also ==
- List of municipalities in São Paulo
