= Mesoregion of Araçatuba =

- Mesoregion
- Location of the Mesoregion of Araçatuba
- Coordinates: 20°48′29″S 49°22′52″W
- Country: Brazil
- Region: Southeast
- State: São Paulo

Area
  - Total: 16,768.1 km^{2} (6,474.2 sq mi)

Population (2010/IBGE)
  - Total: 695,801
  - Density: 41.5/km^{2} (107/sq mi)
- Time zone: UTC-3 (UTC-3)
  - Summer (DST): UTC-2 (UTC-2)
- Area code: +55 18

The Mesoregion of Araçatuba is one of the 15 mesoregions of the São Paulo state, Brazil. It is located at the northwest portion of the state, and has an area of 16,768.1 km^{2}.

The population of the mesoregion is 695,801 inhabitants (IBGE/2010), spread over 36 municipalities.

== Municipalities ==
All data from IBGE/2010

=== Microregion of Andradina ===
- Population: 190,536
- Area (km^{2}): 6,891.6
- Population density (km^{2}): 26.37

Andradina, Castilho, Guaraçaí, Ilha Solteira, Itapura, Mirandópolis, Murutinga do Sul, Nova Independência, Pereira Barreto, Sud Mennucci, Suzanápolis

=== Microregion of Araçatuba ===
- Population: 256,560
- Area (km^{2}): 5,365.6
- Population density (km^{2}): 47.82

Araçatuba, Bento de Abreu, Guararapes, Lavínia, Rubiácea, Santo Antônio do Aracanguá, Valparaíso

=== Microregion of Birigüi ===
- Population: 257,531
- Area (km^{2}): 4,510.9
- Population density (km^{2}): 57.09

Alto Alegre, Avanhandava, Barbosa, Bilac, Birigüi, Braúna, Brejo Alegre, Buritama, Clementina, Coroados, Gabriel Monteiro, Glicério, Lourdes, Luiziânia, Penápolis, Piacatu, Santópolis do Aguapeí, Turiúba

== See also ==
- Interior of São Paulo
