= Microregion of Birigui =

- Microregion
- Location of the Microregion of Birigüi
- Coordinates: 21°17′19″S 50°20′24″W
- Country: Brazil
- Region: Southeast
- State: São Paulo
- Mesoregion: Araçatuba

Area
  - Total: 4,510.9 km^{2} (1,741.7 sq mi)

Population (2010/IBGE)
  - Total: 257,531
  - Density: 57.091/km^{2} (147.86/sq mi)
- Time zone: UTC-3 (UTC-3)
  - Summer (DST): UTC-2 (UTC-2)
- Postal Code: 16200-000
- Area code: +55 18

The Microregion of Birigui (Portuguese: Microrregião de Birigui) is located on the northwest of São Paulo state, Brazil, and is made up of 18 municipalities. It belongs to the Mesoregion of Araçatuba.

The population of the Microregion is 257,531 inhabitants, in an area of 4,510.9 km²

== Municipalities ==
The microregion consists of the following municipalities, listed below with their 2010 Census populations (IBGE/2010):

- Alto Alegre: 4,102
- Avanhandava: 11,310
- Barbosa: 6,593
- Bilac: 7,048
- Birigui: 108,728
- Braúna: 5,021
- Brejo Alegre: 2,573
- Buritama: 15,418
- Clementina: 7,065
- Coroados: 5,238
- Gabriel Monteiro: 2,708
- Glicério: 4,565
- Lourdes: 2,128
- Luiziânia: 5,030
- Penápolis: 58,510
- Piacatu: 5,287
- Santópolis do Aguapeí: 4,277
- Turiúba: 1,930

== See also ==
- Interior of São Paulo
