= Microregion of Araçatuba =

- Microregion
- Location of the Microregion of Araçatuba
- Coordinates: 21°12′32″S 50°25′58″W
- Country: Brazil
- Region: Southeast
- State: São Paulo
- Mesoregion: Araçatuba

Area
  - Total: 5,365.6 km^{2} (2,071.7 sq mi)

Population (2010/IBGE)
  - Total: 256,560
  - Density: 47.816/km^{2} (123.84/sq mi)
- Time zone: UTC-3 (UTC-3)
  - Summer (DST): UTC-2 (UTC-2)
- Postal Code: 16000-000
- Area code: +55 18

The Microregion of Araçatuba (Portuguese: Microrregião de Araçatuba) is located on the northwest of São Paulo state, Brazil, and is made up of 7 municipalities. It belongs to the Mesoregion of Araçatuba.

The population of the Microregion is 256,560 inhabitants, in an area of 5,365.6 km²

== Municipalities ==
The microregion consists of the following municipalities, listed below with their 2010 Census populations (IBGE/2010):

- Araçatuba: 181,579
- Bento de Abreu: 2,674
- Guararapes: 30,597
- Lavínia: 8,779
- Rubiácea: 2,729
- Santo Antônio do Aracanguá: 7,626
- Valparaíso: 22,576

== See also ==
- Interior of São Paulo
