= Araçatuba =

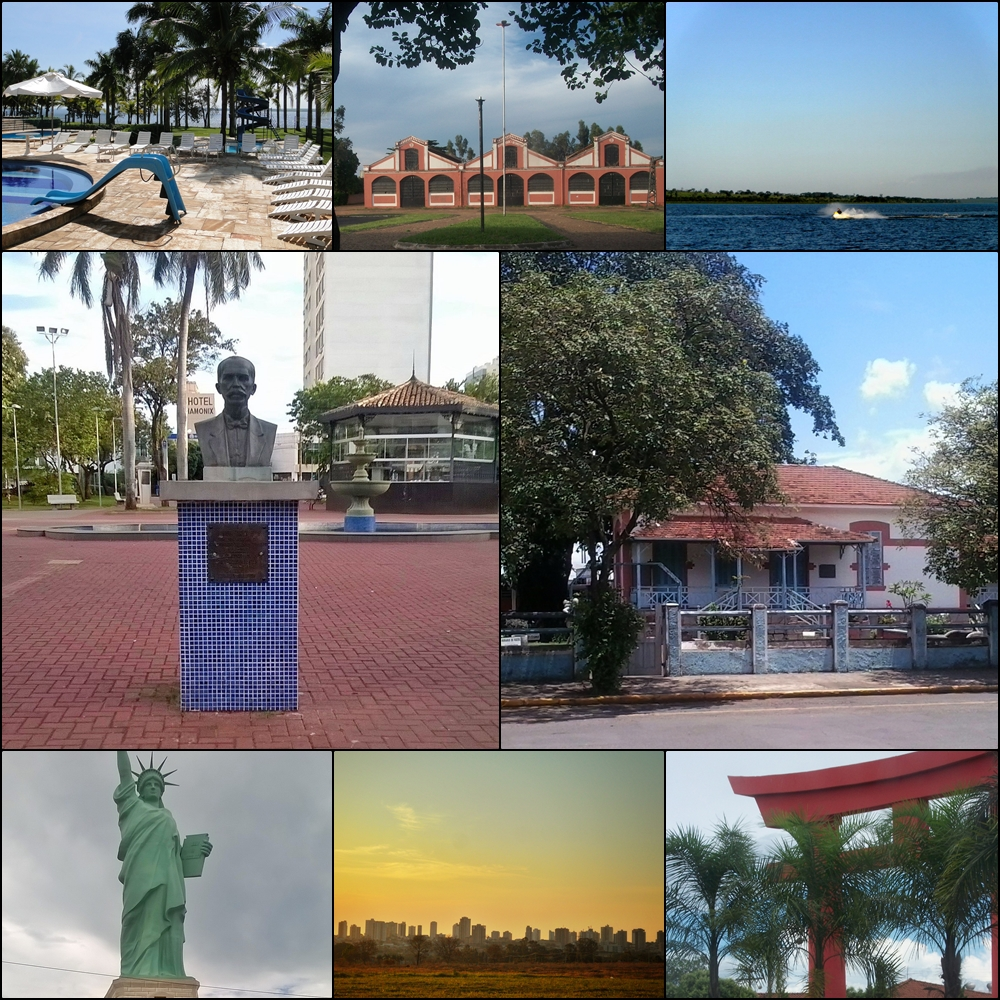

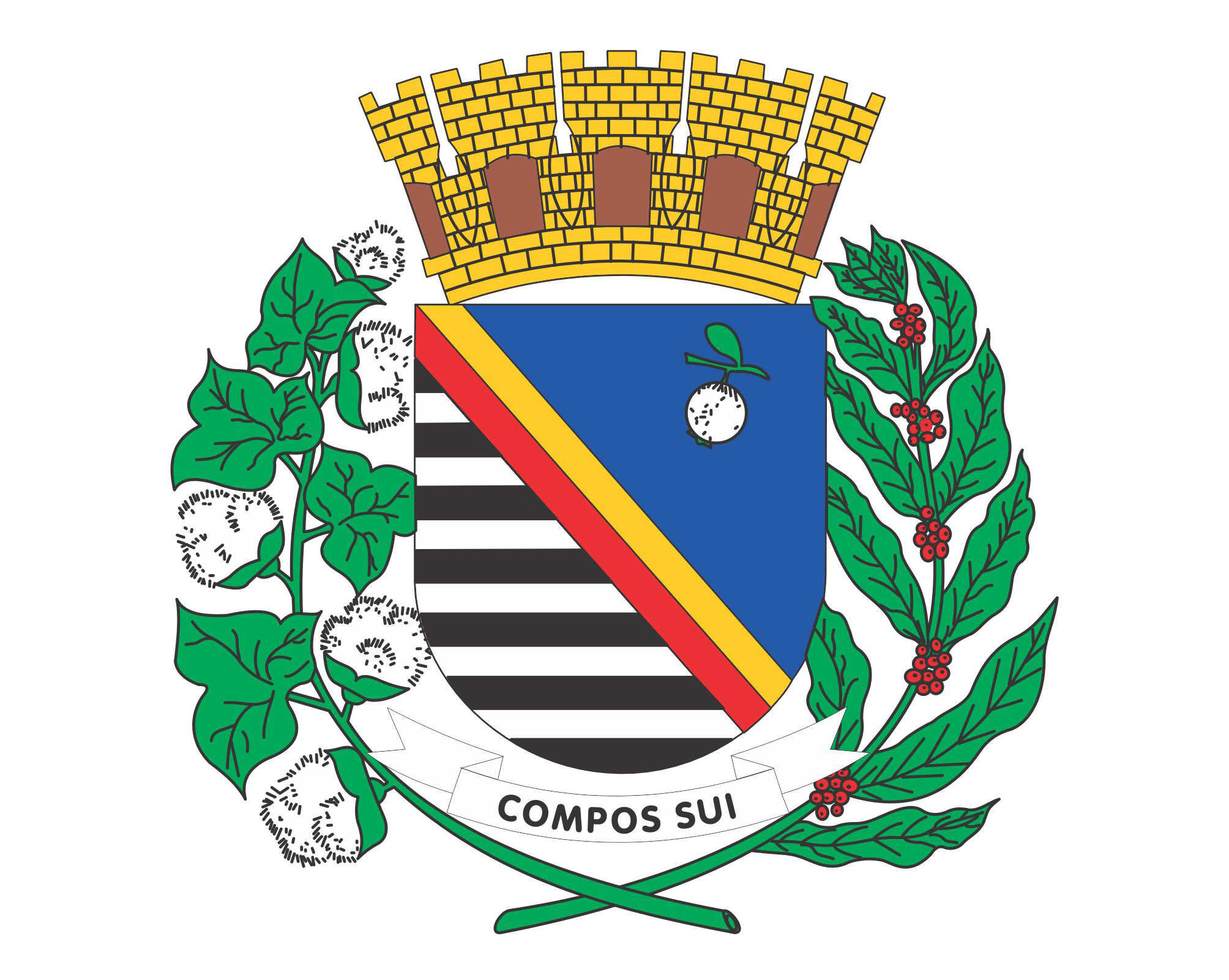
- Flag Coat of arms

- Location of Araçatuba

- Location in Brazil
- Coordinates: 21°12′32″S 50°25′58″W
- Country: Brazil
- Region: Southeast
- State: São Paulo
- Founded: 1908
- City status: 1921

Government
  - Mayor: Lucas Zanatta (PL)

Area
  - Total: 1,167.4 km^{2} (450.7 sq mi)
- Elevation: 390 m (1,280 ft)

Population (2025)
  - Total: 208,415
  - Density: 178.53/km^{2} (462.39/sq mi)
- Time zone: UTC-3 (UTC-3)
  - Summer (DST): UTC-2 (UTC-2)
- Postal code: 16015
- Area code: (+55) 18
- HDI (2000): 0,848 – high
- Website: Prefecture of Araçatuba

Araçatuba is a city located in the northwest of São Paulo state, Brazil. The city has 208,415 inhabitants (IBGE/2025) and spans 1,167 square kilometres (451 sq mi). The city name comes from the Tupi language and means "abundance of araçá" (a fruit, Psidium cattleianum). Araçatuba is located 532 kilometres (331 mi) from São Paulo.

Its origins date back to the coffee boom and, at the turn of the century, its economy was characterized by the growth of sugarcane plantations. This scenario also includes livestock farming, an activity that made it known in the country as the Capital of Fat Cattle due to the negotiations of the arroba of cattle held in Praça Rui Barbosa, in addition to the inclusion of other animal breeding activities such as sheep farming. With a diversified economy, the service sector is the predominant one in the city. Araçatuba is also characterized by being a university hub in the northwest region of the state of São Paulo. It is served by the Brazil-Bolivia Gas Pipeline and the Tietê-Paraná waterway.

== History ==
Araçatuba was founded on December 2, 1908, and officially established as a municipality on December 8, 1921.

== Demographics ==
Historical population (municipality)
Year	Population	%±
1940	45,721	—
1950	59,452	30.0%
1960	81,263	36.7%
1970	108,512	33.5%
1980	129,307	19.2%
1991	159,557	23.4%
2000	169,254	6.1%
2010	181,579	7.3%
2022	200,124	10.2%

== Economy ==
The tertiary sector is the most relevant for Araçatuba, corresponding to 79.35% of the city GDP. The primary sector corresponds to 1.68% of the GDP, and the industry corresponds to 18.97%. Agro-industrial activities are important in the region.

== Microregion of Araçatuba ==
Araçatuba is the center of a microregion with a population of 256,560 inhabitants (IBGE/2010) an area of 5,365.6 km^{2}. This region includes the cities of Bento de Abreu, Guararapes, Lavinia, Rubiácea, Coroados, Santo Antônio do Aracanguá and Valparaíso.

== Media ==
In telecommunications, the city was served by Telecomunicações de São Paulo. In July 1998, this company was acquired by Telefónica, which adopted the Vivo brand in 2012. The company is currently an operator of cell phones, fixed lines, internet (fiber optics/4G) and television (satellite and cable).

== Transportation ==
- SP-300 Rodovia Marechal Cândido Rondon
- SP-463 Rodovia Elyeser Magalhães

The city is served by the Dario Guarita Airport.

Motorcycles and scooters account for 37% of the vehicles in the city, much higher than the country's average of 27%.

== Events ==
The Expô Araçatuba is one of the country's largest agricultural fairs.

== Sport ==
The local football team is Associação Esportiva Araçatuba. Past clubs include Clube Atlético Ferroviário, Araçatuba Futebol Clube, and Atlético Esportivo Araçatuba.

== Climate ==
Climate data for Araçatuba, elevation 397 m (1,302 ft) (1997–2020 normals, extremes 1996–2022)
Month	Jan	Feb	Mar	Apr	May	Jun	Jul	Aug	Sep	Oct	Nov	Dec	Year
Record high °C (°F)	41.0 (105.8)	40.0 (104.0)	38.0 (100.4)	38.0 (100.4)	34.2 (93.6)	34.0 (93.2)	35.7 (96.3)	38.9 (102.0)	42.0 (107.6)	41.0 (105.8)	42.0 (107.6)	41.0 (105.8)	42.0 (107.6)
Mean daily maximum °C (°F)	31.8 (89.2)	32.3 (90.1)	31.9 (89.4)	31.0 (87.8)	27.5 (81.5)	26.8 (80.2)	27.7 (81.9)	29.9 (85.8)	31.4 (88.5)	32.4 (90.3)	32.2 (90.0)	32.4 (90.3)	30.6 (87.1)
Daily mean °C (°F)	26.5 (79.7)	26.9 (80.4)	26.4 (79.5)	25.2 (77.4)	21.6 (70.9)	20.7 (69.3)	20.9 (69.6)	22.7 (72.9)	24.6 (76.3)	26.0 (78.8)	26.2 (79.2)	26.8 (80.2)	24.5 (76.2)
Mean daily minimum °C (°F)	21.1 (70.0)	21.4 (70.5)	20.8 (69.4)	19.2 (66.6)	15.6 (60.1)	14.5 (58.1)	14.0 (57.2)	15.4 (59.7)	17.7 (63.9)	19.5 (67.1)	20.2 (68.4)	21.0 (69.8)	18.4 (65.1)
Record low °C (°F)	14.0 (57.2)	15.7 (60.3)	15.6 (60.1)	8.2 (46.8)	5.2 (41.4)	1.8 (35.2)	1.8 (35.2)	2.1 (35.8)	5.0 (41.0)	10.0 (50.0)	13.3 (55.9)	15.0 (59.0)	1.8 (35.2)
Average precipitation mm (inches)	301.5 (11.87)	200.0 (7.87)	136.0 (5.35)	76.3 (3.00)	64.5 (2.54)	45.2 (1.78)	24.3 (0.96)	28.1 (1.11)	82.0 (3.23)	104.1 (4.10)	128.7 (5.07)	175.5 (6.91)	1,366.2 (53.79)
Average precipitation days (≥ 1.0 mm)	14.9	12.8	10.0	5.2	4.8	3.5	2.7	2.4	5.3	8.0	9.0	11.9	90.5
Source: Centro Integrado de Informações Agrometeorológicas

== Photo gallery ==
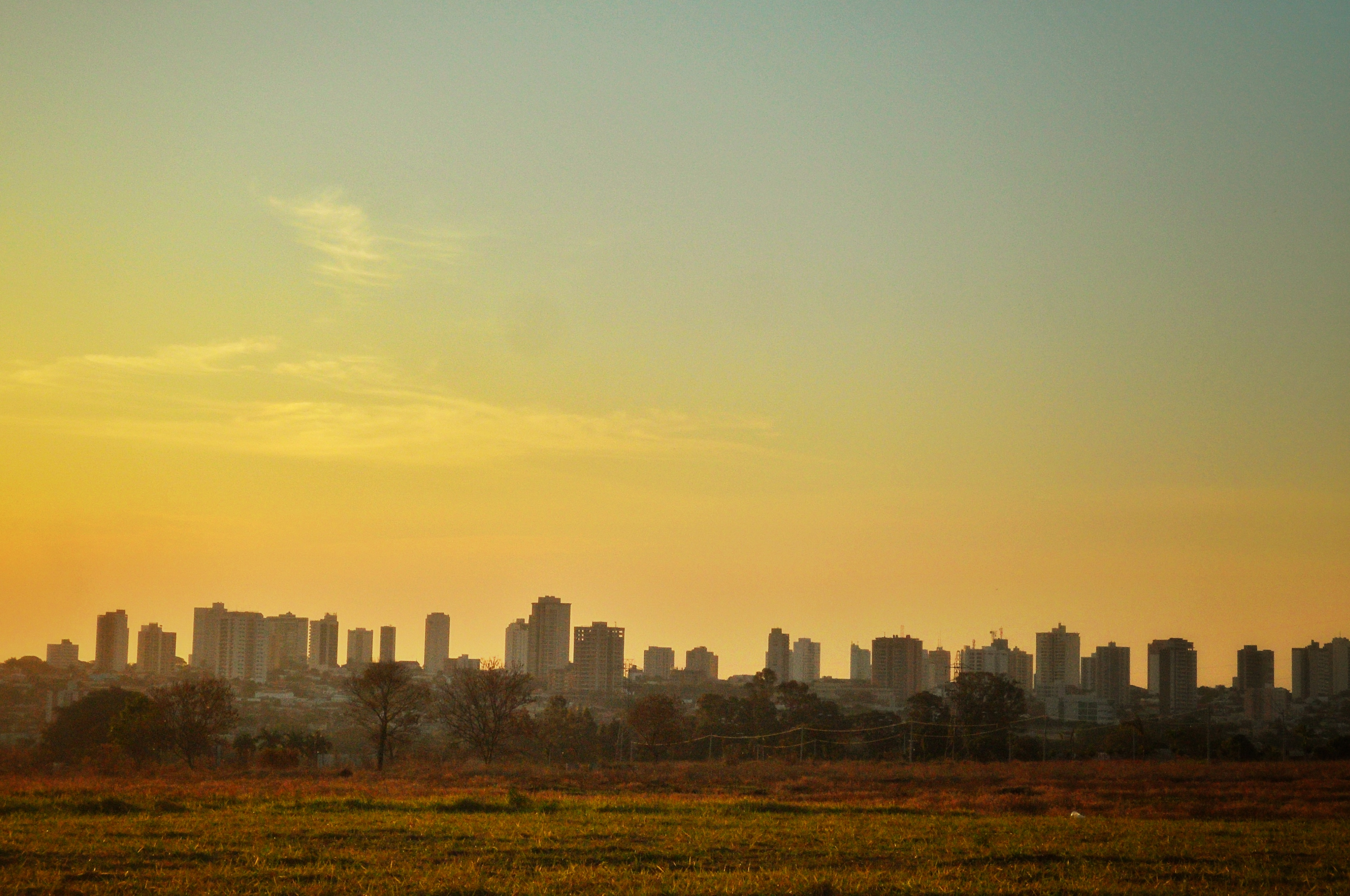
Sunset over Araçatuba

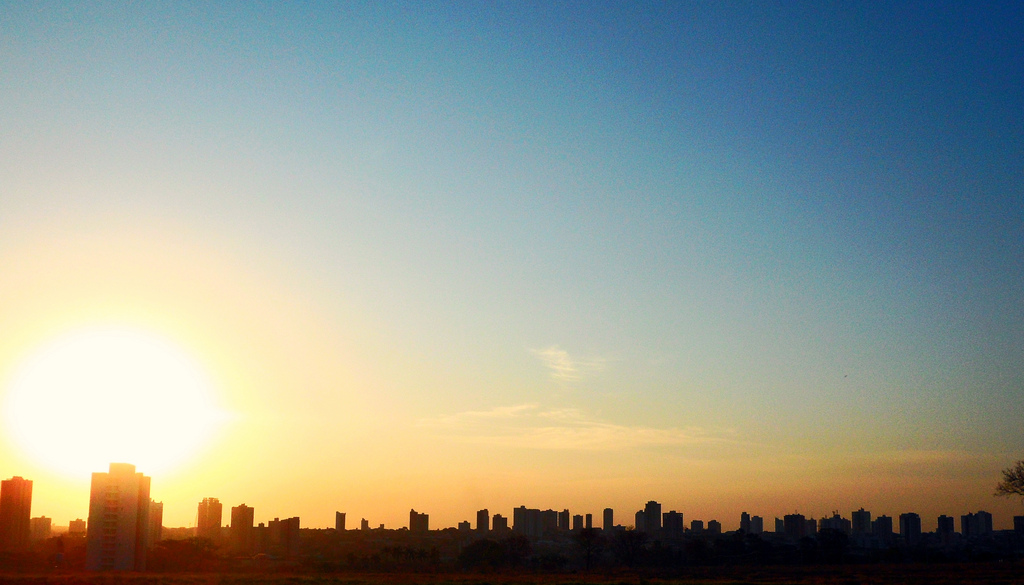
Dusk and cityscape

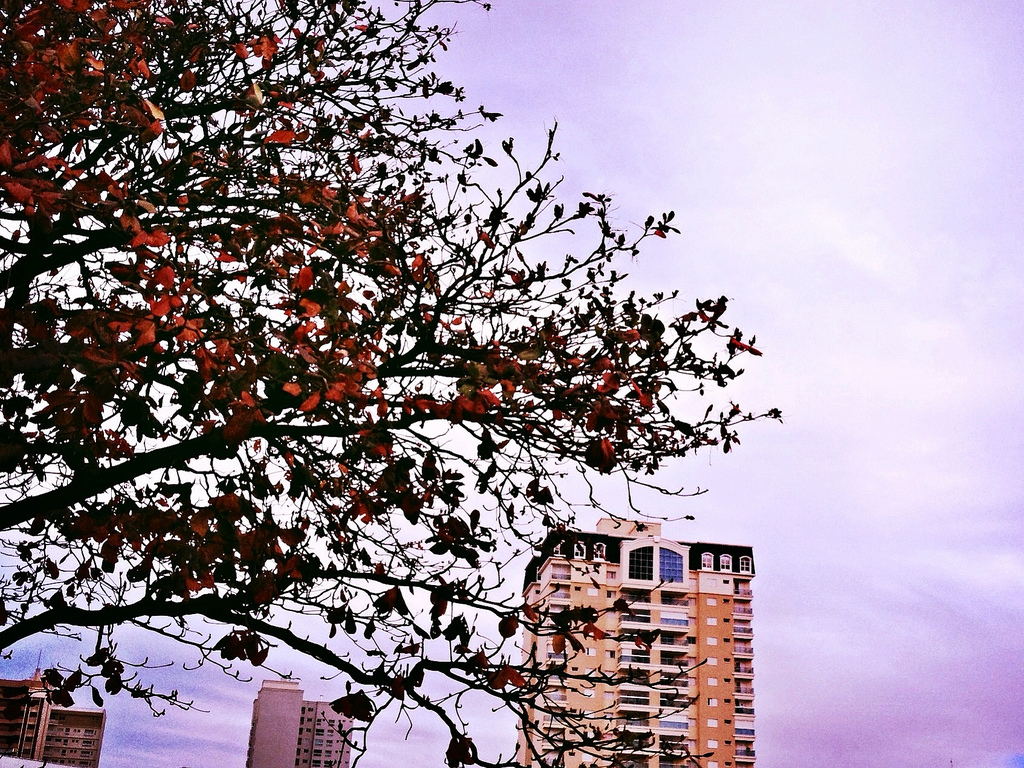
Buildings

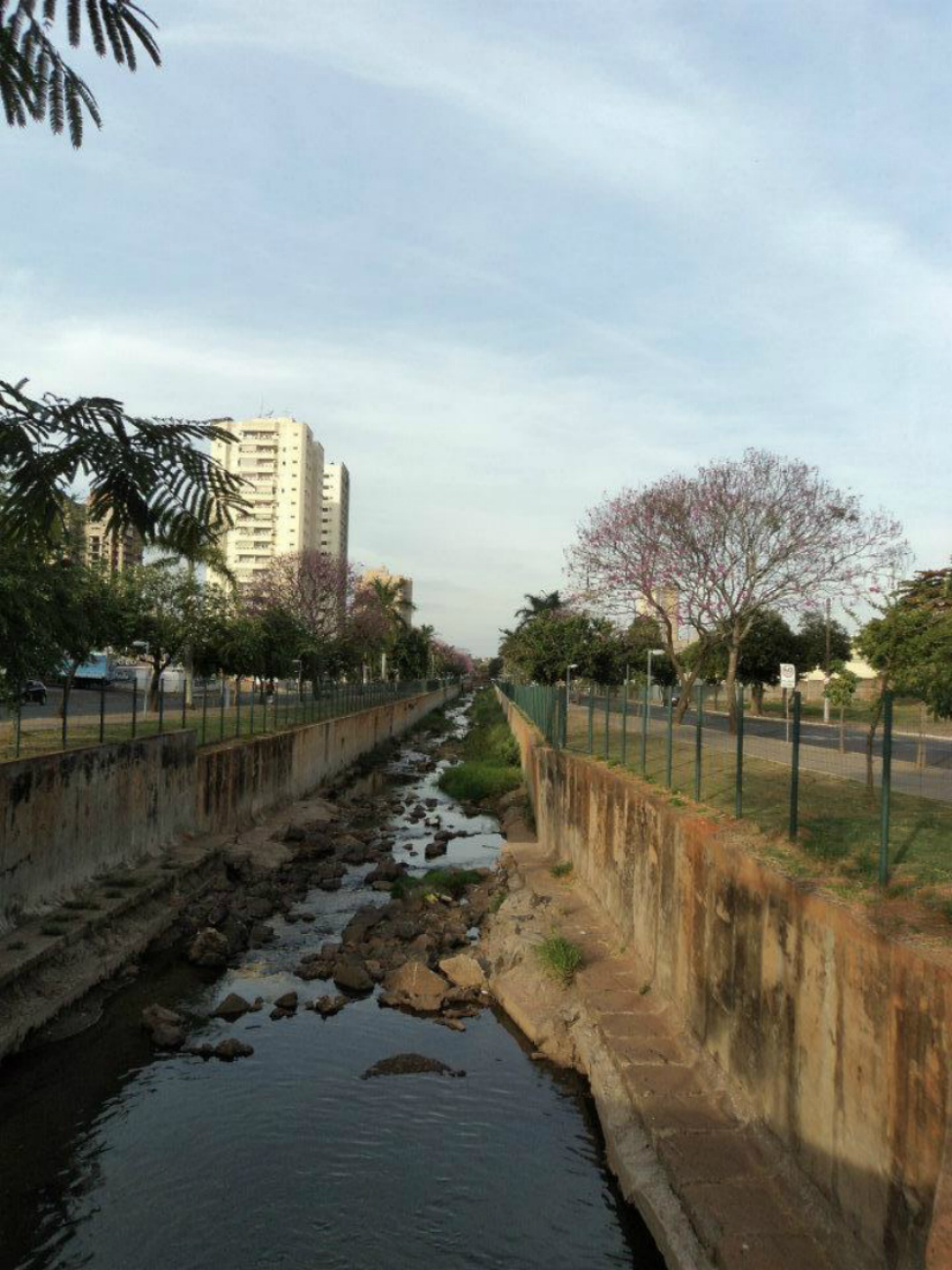
Machadinho creek and Pompeu de Toledo Avenue

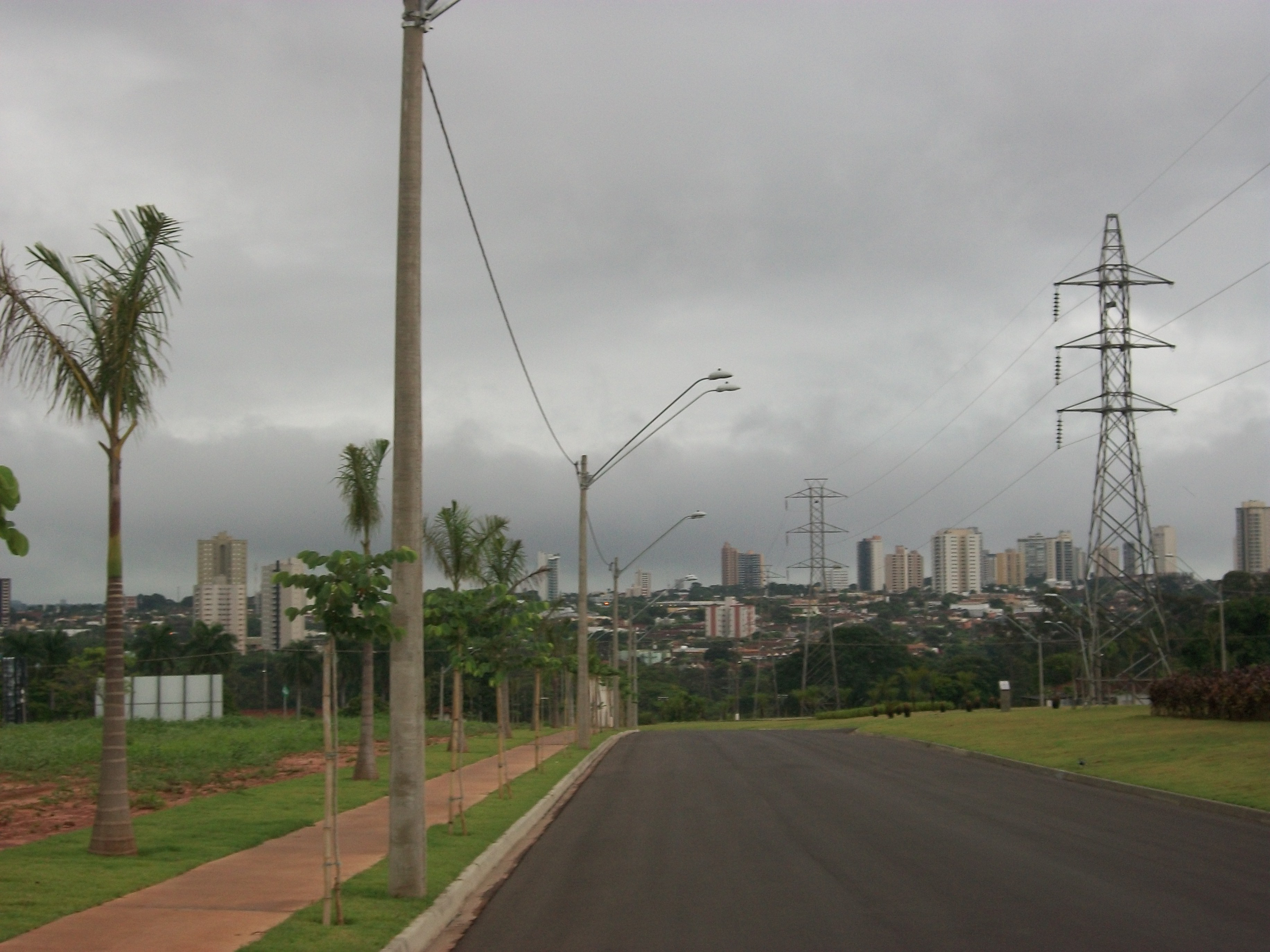
Partial cityscape from Abraão Buchala Avenue

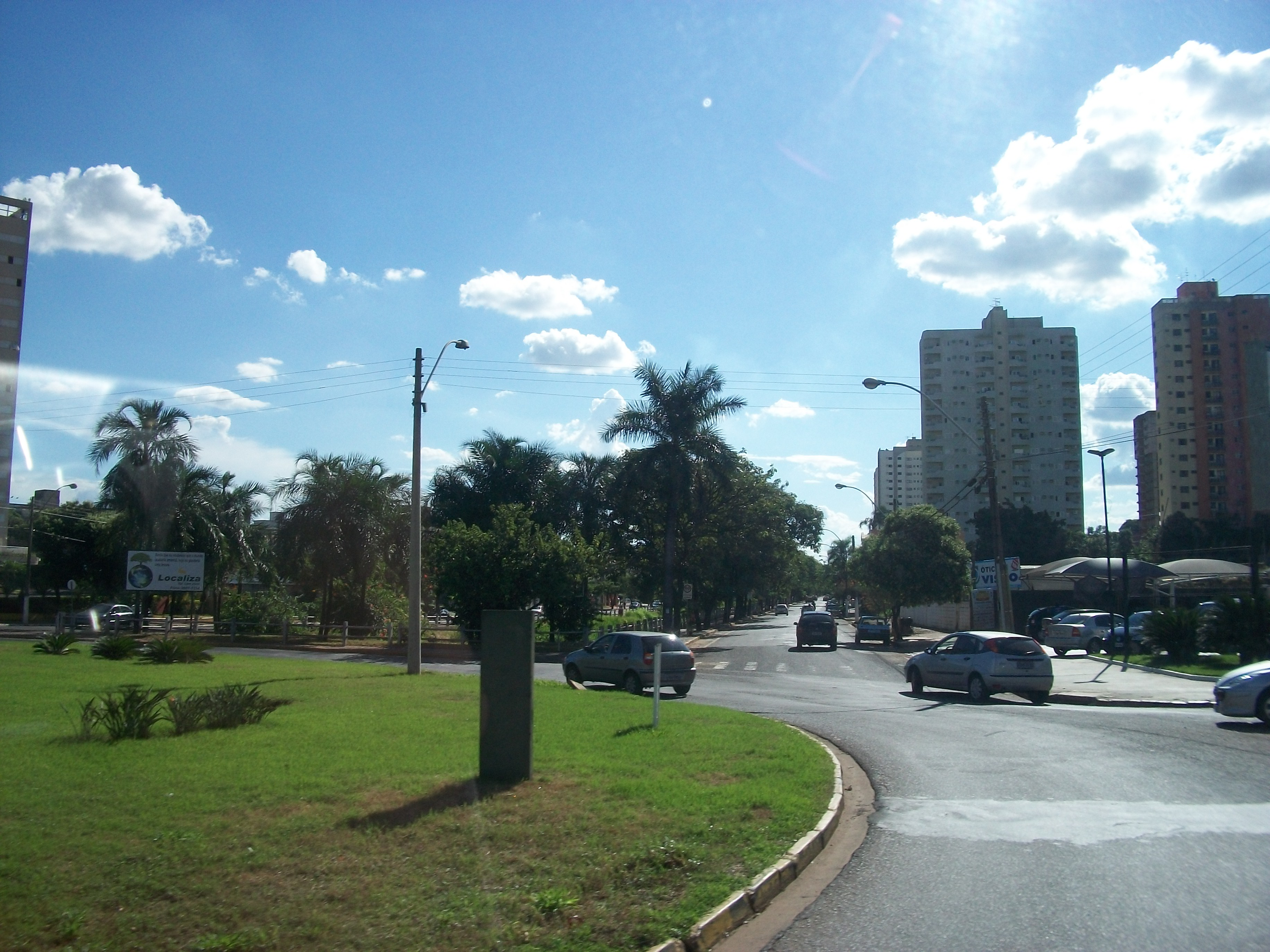
Pompeu de Toledo Avenue and Brasília Avenue crossing

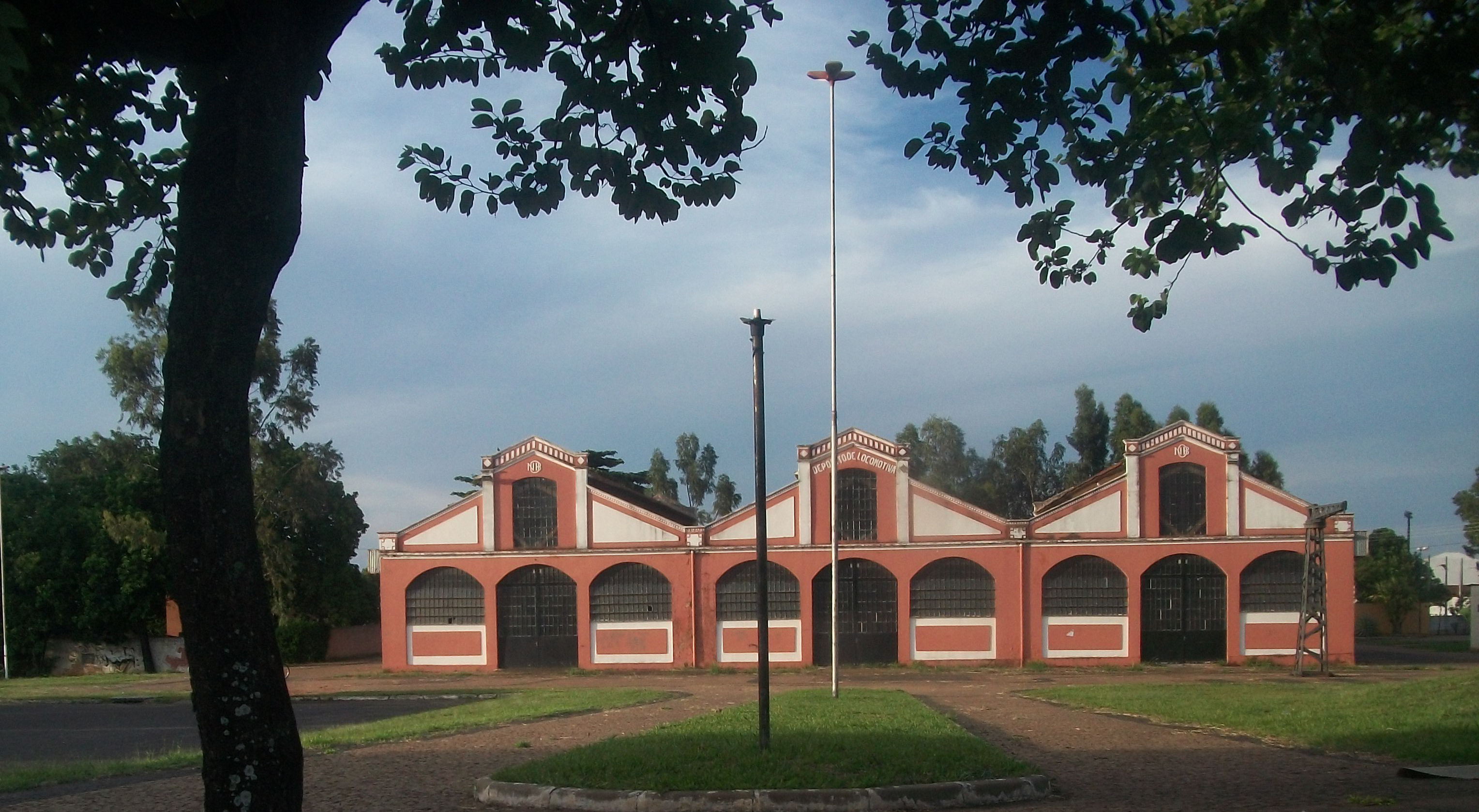
Historic building and cultural center

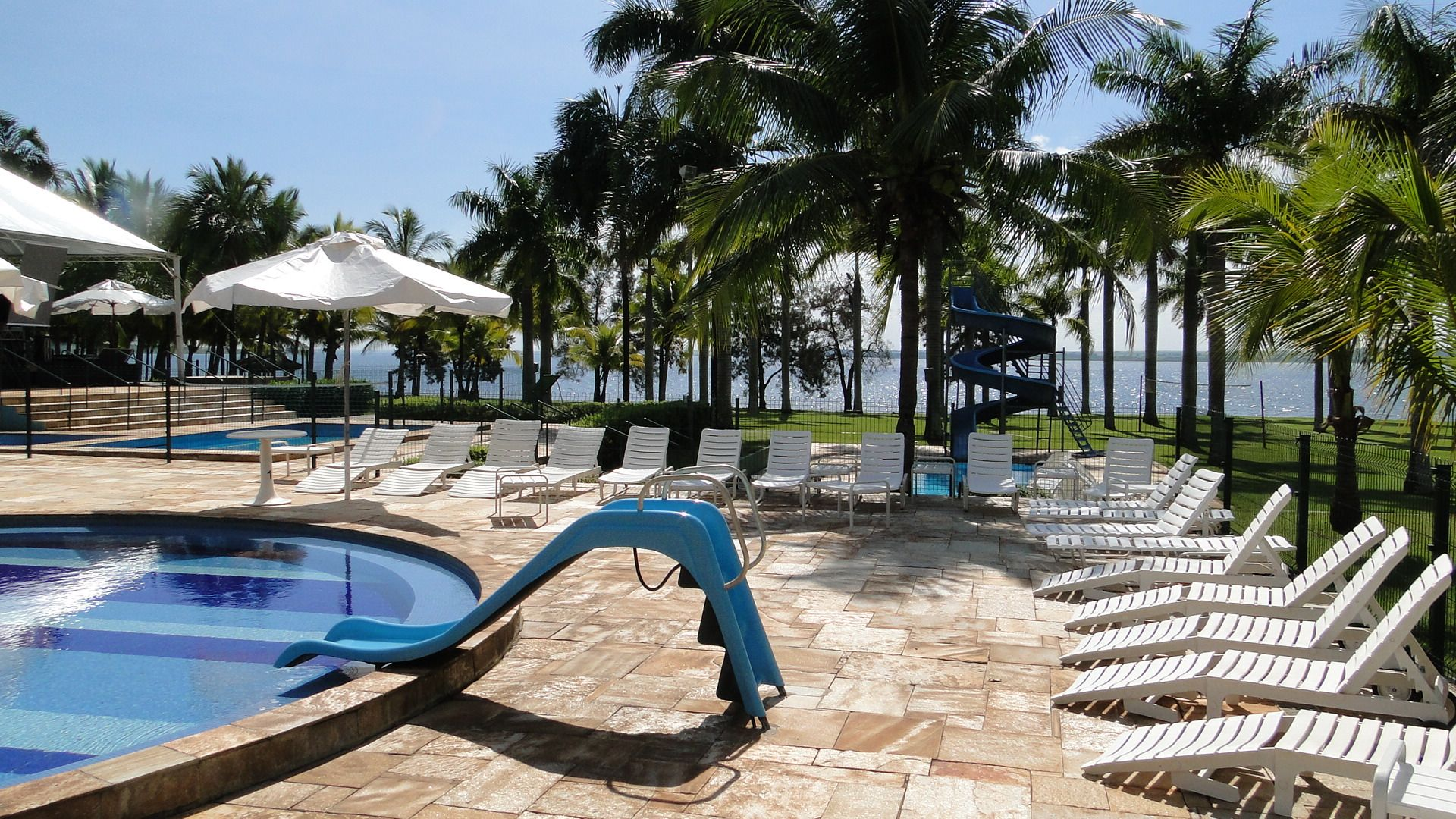
Yacht club and Tietê riverside

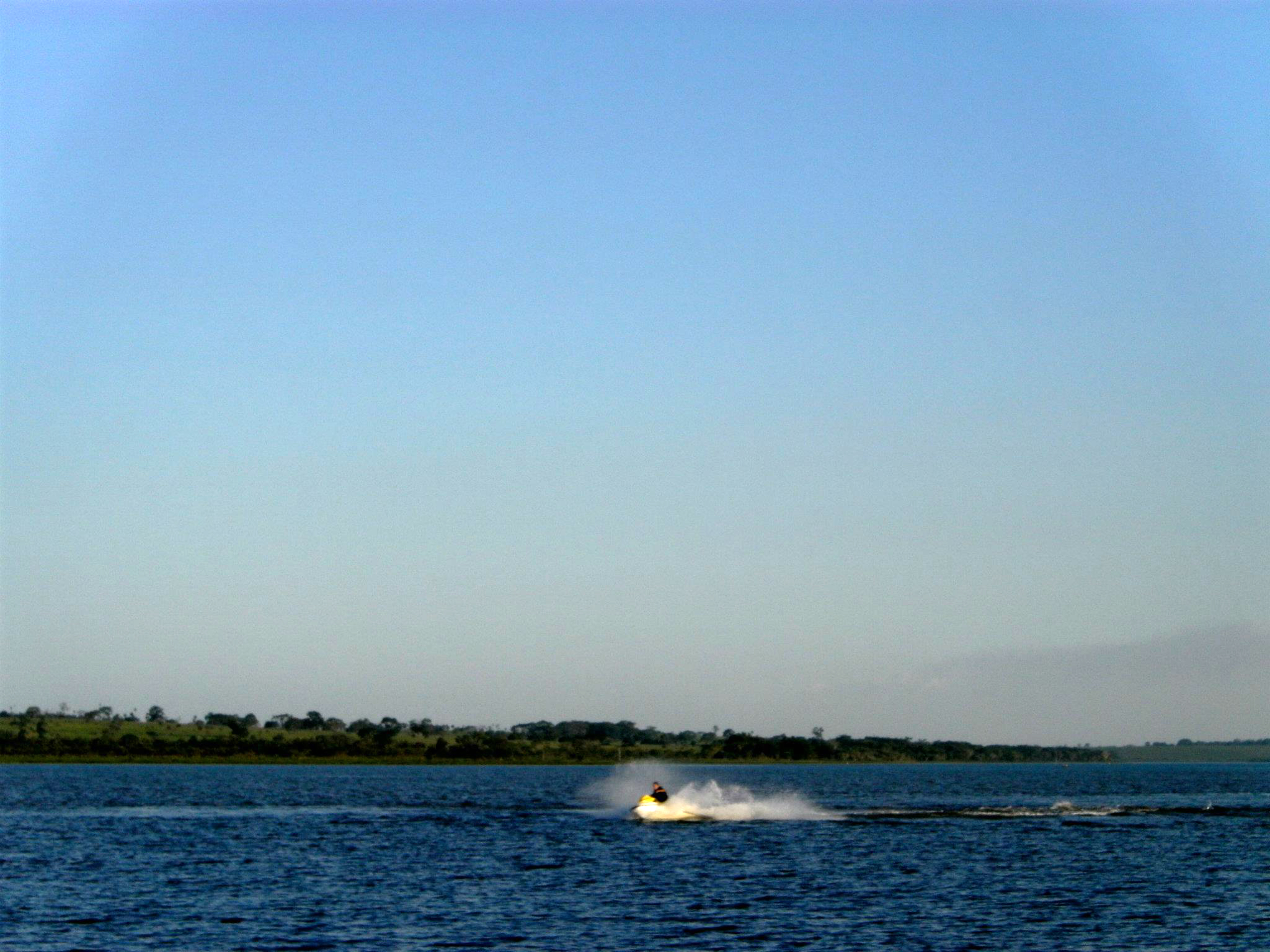
Jet-skiing on Tietê river

== See also ==
- List of municipalities in São Paulo
- Interior of São Paulo
