= Alto Alegre, São Paulo =

Municipality in the state of São Paulo in Brazil

Alto Alegre
- Municipality
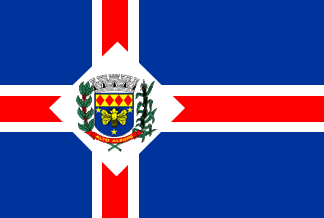
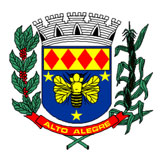
- Flag Coat of arms

- Location in São Paulo state

- Location in Brazil
- Coordinates: 21°35′10″S 50°10′0″W
- Country: Brazil
- Region: Southeast
- State: São Paulo

Area
  - Total: 319 km^{2} (123 sq mi)

Population (2020)
  - Total: 4,088
  - Density: 12.8/km^{2} (33.2/sq mi)
- Time zone: UTC−3 (BRT)

Alto Alegre (Portuguese: [ˈaw.tu aˈlɛ.ɡɾi]) is a municipality in the Brazilian state of São Paulo. The population is 4,088 (2020 est.) in an area of 319 km^{2}. The municipality comprises the main town and the districts of Jatobá and São Martinho d'Oeste.

== History ==
The District of Alto Alegre was created by State Decree-Law No. 6,713 on September 29, 1934, and was subordinated to the municipality of Penápolis. It was elevated to the status of a municipality by State Law No. 2,456 on December 30, 1953, separating it from Penápolis. At the time, it consisted of two districts: Alto Alegre and São Martinho d'Oeste. In 1960, the district of Jatobá was added.

== Demographics ==
Historical population (municipality)
Year	Population	%±
1960	10,304	—
1970	7,473	−27.5%
1980	6,080	−18.6%
1991	4,787	−21.3%
2000	4,261	−11.0%
2010	4,102	−3.7%
2022	3,841	−6.4%

== Geography ==
Alto Alegre is located at a latitude of 21º34' South and a longitude of 50º09' West. Its estimated population in 2017 was 4,154 inhabitants, and the 2010 census recorded a population of 4,102 inhabitants.

The municipality has an area of 318.216 km². With over 4,000 inhabitants, the city is located approximately 23 kilometers from Penápolis, accessible via the Raul Forchero Casasco Highway. The territorial area is 310 km². Alto Alegre borders Penápolis to the north, Luiziânia to the southwest, Promissão to the east, Getulina to the south, and Braúna to the west.

=== Hydrography ===
- Feio River (also known as Aguapeí River)

== Highways ==
- SP-419

=== Administration ===
- Mayor: Carlos Sussumi Ivama (2021–2024)
- Vice-Mayor: Adhemar Martins Flores

== Media ==
In telecommunications, the city was served by Companhia Telefônica Brasileira until 1973, when it began to be served by Telecomunicações de São Paulo. In July 1998, this company was acquired by Telefónica, which adopted the Vivo brand in 2012.

The company is currently an operator of cell phones, fixed lines, internet (fiber optics/4G) and television (satellite and cable).

== See also ==
- List of municipalities in São Paulo
- Interior of São Paulo
