= Bilac =

Municipality in the state of São Paulo in Brazil

- Municipality
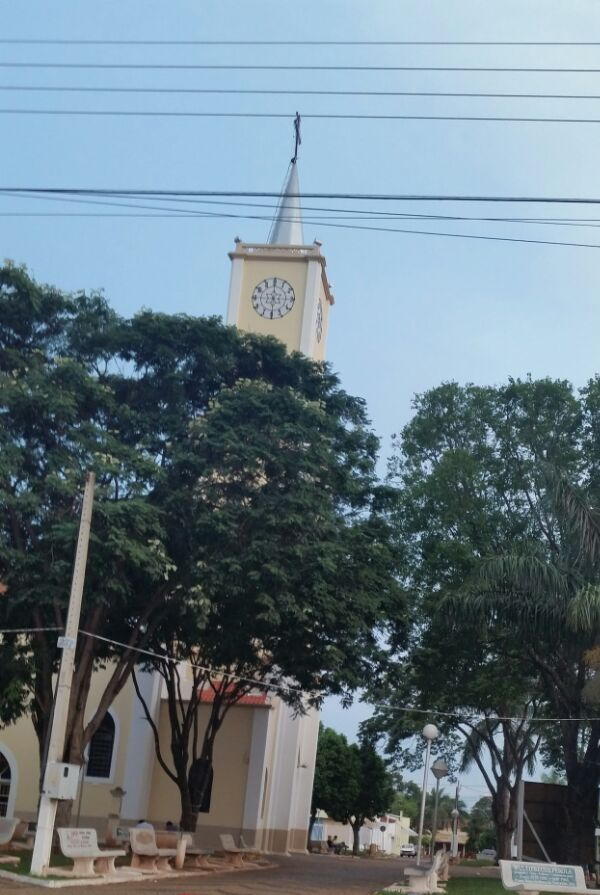

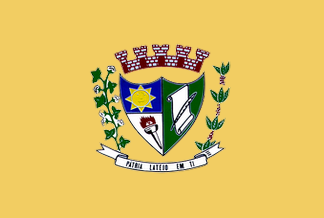
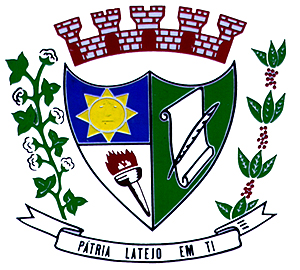
- Flag Coat of arms

- Location in São Paulo state

- Location in Brazil
- Coordinates: 21°24′12″S 50°28′14″W
- Country: Brazil
- Region: Southeast
- State: São Paulo

Area
  - Total: 158 km^{2} (61 sq mi)

Population (2020)
  - Total: 8,117
  - Density: 51.4/km^{2} (133/sq mi)
- Time zone: UTC−3 (BRT)

Bilac is a municipality in the state of São Paulo in Brazil. The population is 8,117 (2020 est.) in an area of 158 km^{2} (61 sq mi). The elevation is 431 m.

== History ==
Bilac's old town and the district of the city arose from Penápolis piece of land belonged to Brazil Plantation Trade Union and today is a small city in São Paulo State, which is located in the northwest of the state.

In 1917 the blend of land attracted many families who settled in the town, which received the designation of Stream of the Colony (Córrego da Colônia), by engineers of the time. The company promoted Brazil Plantation Trade Union, in 1927, blending of their land, attracting several settlers, among them, Fernando Rodrigues, Francisco Lopes Rodrigues, Jose Goncalves and Hicoiti Yoshiy that with their families, have settled in the region, calling it "stream of the colony (Córrego da Colônia)".

Later, the Vila Conceição Company, consisting of Osvaldo Martins, Sakae Sato, Shoe Anzai and Toshio Yoshiy, bought land and then proceeded to blend the earth, then when the first house was built of timber belonging to Mr John Nery, followed by several other buildings and attracting more people moving the economy and bringing the progress for the region.

On February 10, 1923 the City Council voted to lift Birigui of the village to the condition of town, giving it the name of "Vila Nossa Senhora da Conceição", in honor of a local patron. The progress of the town once was felt, with the facility in 1928, the public cemetery and in 1930, the district police.

After 10 years, on 18 August 1933 is high for the District of Peace with “Nipolândia” name, in homage to the great Japanese colony in the region. However, the current name (Bilac) came under Decree No. 9775 of November 30, 1928 in order to honor the great poet brother, Olavo Brás Martins dos Guimarães Bilac. Six years later, on November 30, 1944, by Decree - Law No. 14,334, the District of Bilac was elevated to the category of city, installed on January 1, 1945, with the Districts of Peace of Bilac and Piacatu.

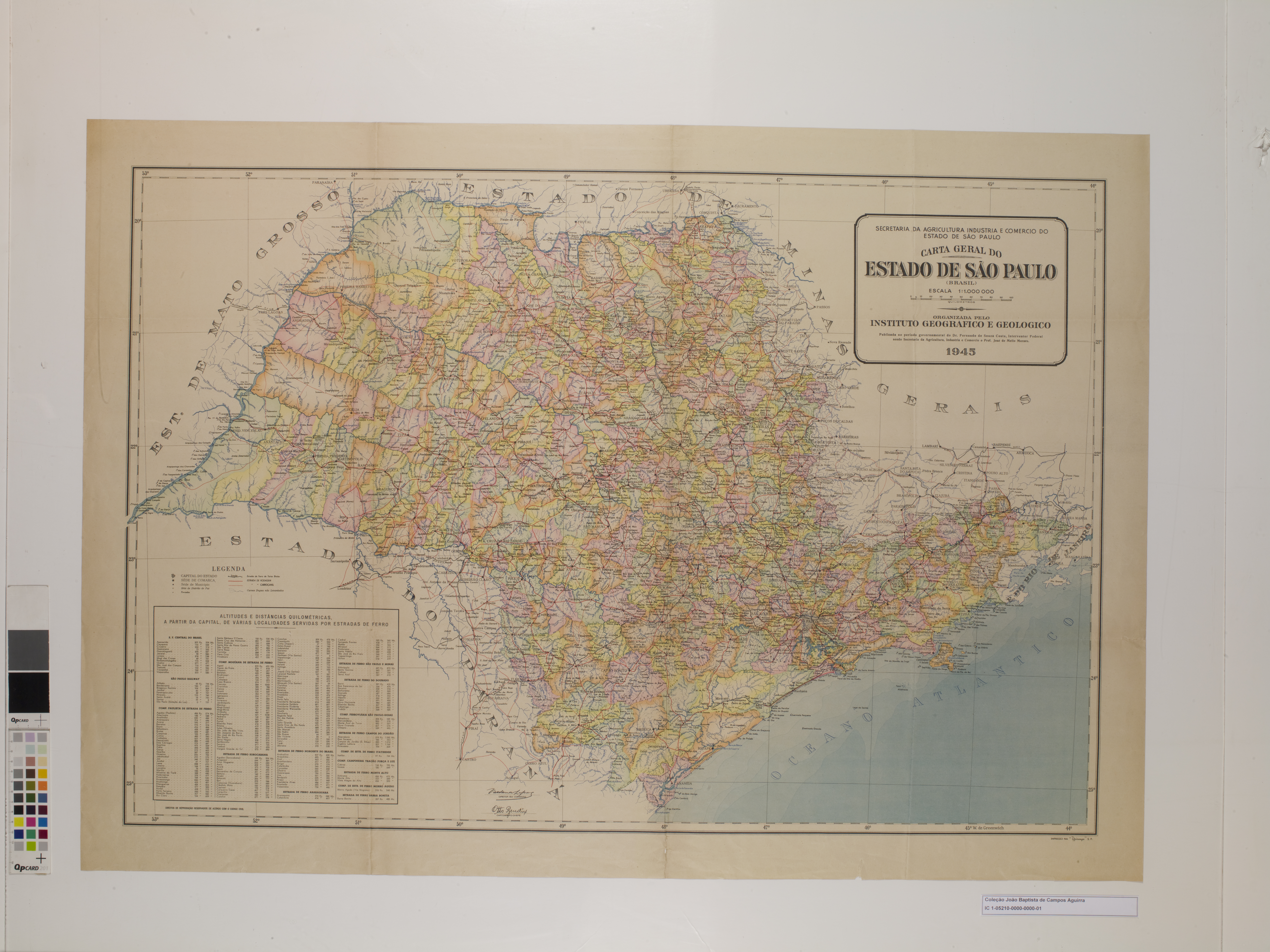
Map of the state of São Paulo (1944).

And then built the Gabriel Monteiro on 24 December 1948. Piacatu was dismembered of Bilac in 1953, becoming municipality.

April 18, 1925 - when it was done deed of donation for the heritage. It celebrates the anniversary of the city on April 18.

== Demographics ==
Historical population (municipality)
Year	Population	%±
1950	23,160	—
1960	9,857	−57.4%
1970	5,976	−39.4%
1980	5,332	−10.8%
1991	5,460	2.4%
2000	6,088	11.5%
2010	7,048	15.8%
2022	7,319	3.8%

== Media ==
In telecommunications, the city was served by Telecomunicações de São Paulo. In July 1998, this company was acquired by Telefónica, which adopted the Vivo brand in 2012. The company is currently an operator of cell phones, fixed lines, internet (fiber optics/4G) and television (satellite and cable).

== See also ==
- List of municipalities in São Paulo
- Interior of São Paulo
