= Glicério =

- Municipality
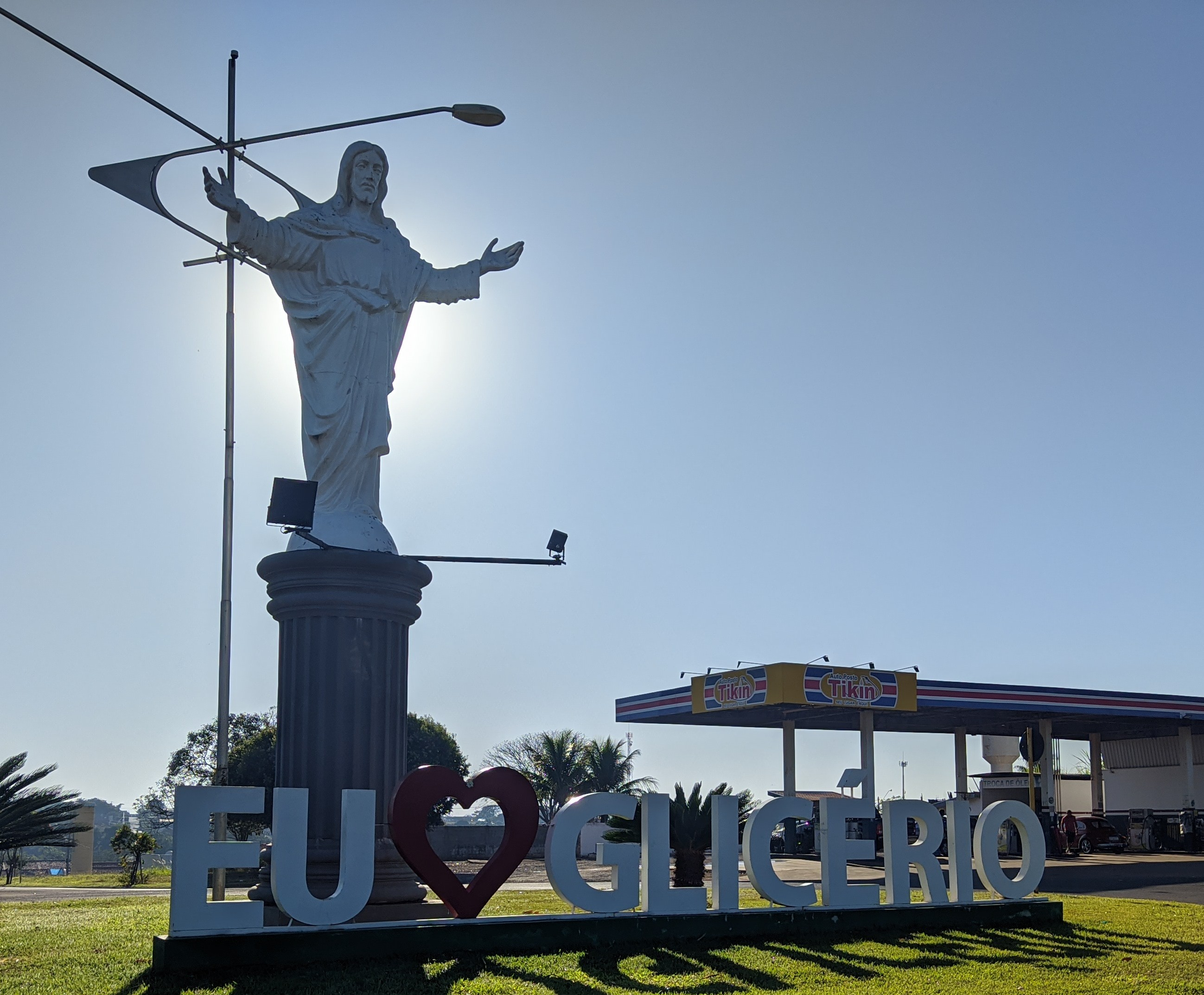

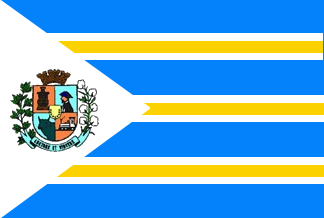
- Flag Coat of arms

- Location in São Paulo state

- Location in Brazil
- Coordinates: 21°22′34″S 50°12′21″W
- Country: Brazil
- Region: Southeast
- State: São Paulo

Area
  - Total: 273 km^{2} (105 sq mi)

Population (2020)
  - Total: 4,829
  - Density: 17.7/km^{2} (45.8/sq mi)
- Time zone: UTC−3 (BRT)

Glicério (Portuguese pronunciation: [ɡliˈsɛɾju]) is a municipality in the state of São Paulo in Brazil. The population is 4,829 (2020 est.) in an area of 273 km^{2}. The elevation is 400 m. The city is known for being the birthplace of former president of Brazil, Jair Bolsonaro.

The city was originally founded in 1906 as the village of Povoado de Castilho. The name of the village originated from the presence of the Castilho family who set up the first ranches in the area.

== Climate ==
According to the Köppen climate classification, Glicério experiences a tropical savanna climate (Aw). This climate zone is characterized by hot, rainy summers and dry, mild winters. The warmest month typically averages above 22 °C (71.6 °F), while the coldest month stays below 18 °C (64.4 °F) but remains above −3 °C (26.6 °F). Precipitation is heavily concentrated in the summer months, while the winter experiences a distinct dry season with significantly lower rainfall levels

== Media ==
In telecommunications, the city was served by Companhia Telefônica Brasileira until 1973, when it began to be served by Telecomunicações de São Paulo. In July 1998, this company was acquired by Telefónica, which adopted the Vivo brand in 2012.

The company is currently an operator of cell phones, fixed lines, internet (fiber optics/4G) and television (satellite and cable).

== Notable people ==
- Jair Bolsonaro (born 1955) 38th President of Brazil and former Federal Deputy of Brazil and captain of the Brazilian Army.

== See also ==
- Interior of São Paulo
