= Avanhandava =

Municipality in the state of São Paulo in Brazil

- Municipality
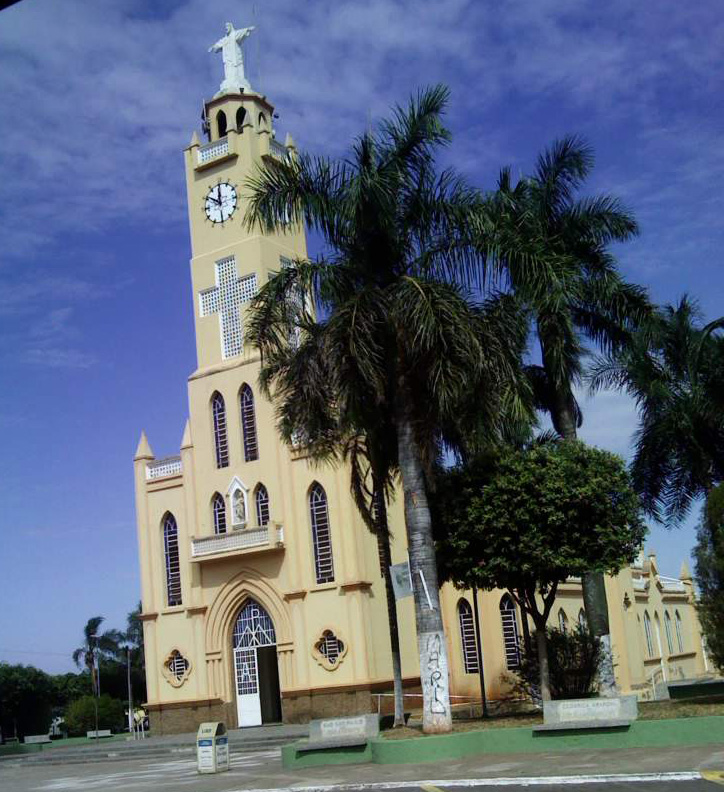

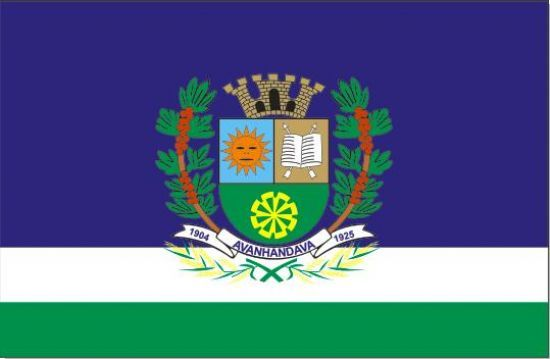
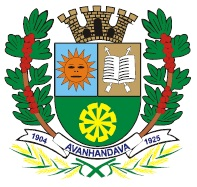
- Flag Coat of arms

- Location in São Paulo state

- Location in Brazil
- Coordinates: 21°27′39″S 49°56′59″W
- Country: Brazil
- Region: Southeast
- State: São Paulo

Area
  - Total: 338 km^{2} (131 sq mi)

Population (2020)
  - Total: 13,859
  - Density: 41.0/km^{2} (106/sq mi)
- Time zone: UTC−3 (BRT)

Avanhandava is a municipality in the state of São Paulo in Brazil. The population is 13,859 (2020 est.) in an area of 338 km^{2}. The elevation is 428 m.

== Demographics ==
Historical population (municipality)
Year	Population	%±
1940	13,719	—
1950	8,486	−38.1%
1960	6,752	−20.4%
1970	5,974	−11.5%
1980	6,399	7.1%
1991	7,973	24.6%
2000	8,829	10.7%
2010	11,310	28.1%
2022	11,263	−0.4%

== Media ==
In telecommunications, the city was served by Companhia Telefônica Brasileira until 1973, when it began to be served by Telecomunicações de São Paulo. In July 1998, this company was acquired by Telefónica, which adopted the Vivo brand in 2012.

The company is currently an operator of cell phones, fixed lines, internet (fiber optics/4G) and television (satellite and cable).

== See also ==
- List of municipalities in São Paulo
- Interior of São Paulo
