= Valparaíso, São Paulo =

Valparaíso
- Municipality
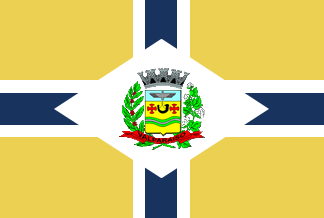
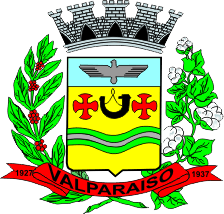
- Flag Coat of arms

- Location in São Paulo state

- Location in Brazil
- Coordinates: 21°13′40″S 50°52′6″W
- Country: Brazil
- Region: Southeast
- State: São Paulo

Area
  - Total: 858 km^{2} (331 sq mi)

Population (2022)
  - Total: 24,723
  - Density: 28.8/km^{2} (74.6/sq mi)
- Time zone: UTC−3 (BRT)

Valparaíso (English: /ˌvɑːlpɑːrɑːˈiːsoʊ/ VAHL-pah-rah-EE-soh) is a municipality in the state of São Paulo in Brazil. The population is 26,822 (2020 est.) in an area of 858 km^{2} (331 sq mi).

== History ==
The municipality was established in 1937, when it was separated from Araçatuba.

The town was founded by Francisco Leite Vieira in the early 1930s because of the expanding cultivation of coffee, however the land was inhabited by the Barbosa family in the early decade of 1900. Unfortunately, the Barbosa family did not have enough money to establish the land, so Vieira was the founder due to monetary reasons. During this period, the lands of the northwest regions of the state were already taken by coffee farmers searching through the forests of the west in search of new land for planting. There were many conflicts, mainly on the banks of the river Aguapeí between the Indians who inhabited the region and the coffee barons eager to expand their crops.

By the end of the 40s the region seduced the coffee baron Geremias Lunardeli, who had acquired a large area for the expansion of his plantations. Lunardeli already had some coffee plantations in Northwestern São Paulo and northern Paraná and acquired the farm now known as Aguapeí. He encouraged other distinguished coffee barons of the time to do the same. Thus, part of the family Cunha Bueno, Geremias which was very close, also acquired several farms in the region, including Saint Helena, Pinheiro Machado, Buenópolis - Lavinia, Santa Maria - Bento de Abreu.

== Geography ==
The elevation is 449 m.

=== Highways ===
- SP-300
- SP-541

== Administration ==
- Mayor: Lúcio Santo de Lima (2017/2020)

== Economy ==
The main economic activity is the cultivation and industrialization of sugar cane to produce sugar and the alcohol fuel used in motor vehicles. There are secondary crops of maize, coffee and, predominantly beef, cattle. The town has two distilleries, Univalem belonging to the group Cosan, and Da Mata development groups Greendene and Brasif. A unit of Ajinomoto exists in the town, where the production of an amino acid called lysine, used in the fattening of animals, especially pig takes place. The Agricultural Jacarezinho, owned group Greendene is distinguished by advanced genetics of cattle and has the largest private forest reserve of the State of São Paulo.

== Media ==
In telecommunications, the city was served by Telecomunicações de São Paulo. In July 1998, this company was acquired by Telefónica, which adopted the Vivo brand in 2012.

The company is currently an operator of cell phones, fixed lines, internet (fiber optics/4G) and television (satellite and cable).

== See also ==
- List of municipalities in São Paulo
- Interior of São Paulo
