= Santo Antônio do Aracanguá =

- Municipality
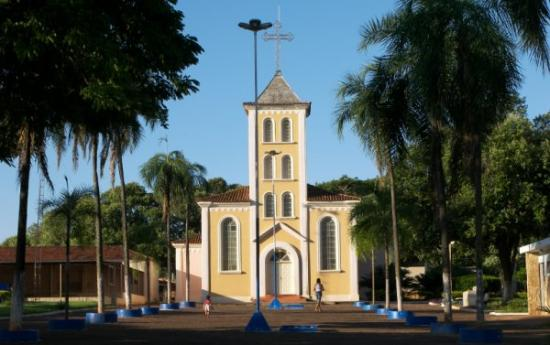

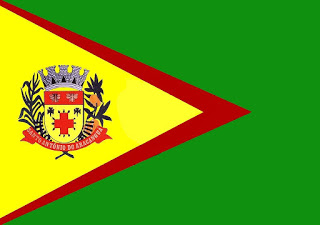
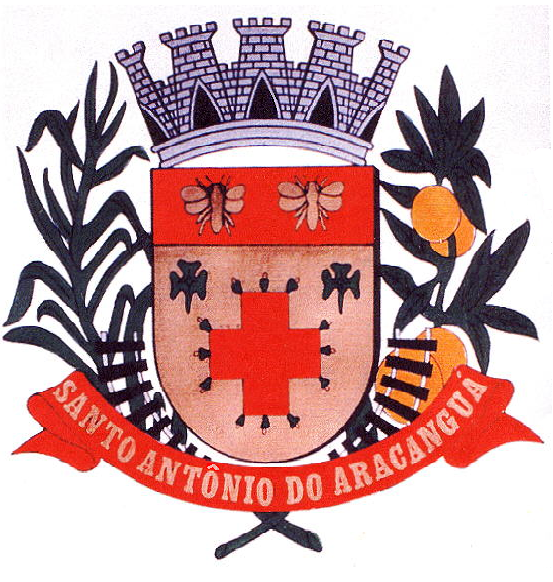
- Flag Coat of arms

- Location in São Paulo state

- Location in Brazil
- Coordinates: 20°56′20″S 50°29′44″W
- Country: Brazil
- Region: Southeast Brazil
- State: São Paulo

Area
  - Total: 1,308.19 km^{2} (505.09 sq mi)

Population (2020)
  - Total: 8,481
  - Density: 6.483/km^{2} (16.79/sq mi)
- Time zone: UTC−3 (BRT)

Santo Antônio do Aracanguá is a municipality in the northwestern part of the state of São Paulo, Brazil. The population is 8,481 (2020 est.) in an area of 1,308.19 km^{2} (505.09 sq mi). The elevation is 385 m. The municipality was founded in 1993.

== Media ==
In telecommunications, the city was served by Telecomunicações de São Paulo. In July 1998, this company was acquired by Telefónica, which adopted the Vivo brand in 2012. The company is currently an operator of cell phones, fixed lines, internet (fiber optics/4G) and television (satellite and cable).

== See also ==
- List of municipalities in São Paulo
- Interior of São Paulo
