= Penápolis =

- Municipality
- Municipality of Penápolis
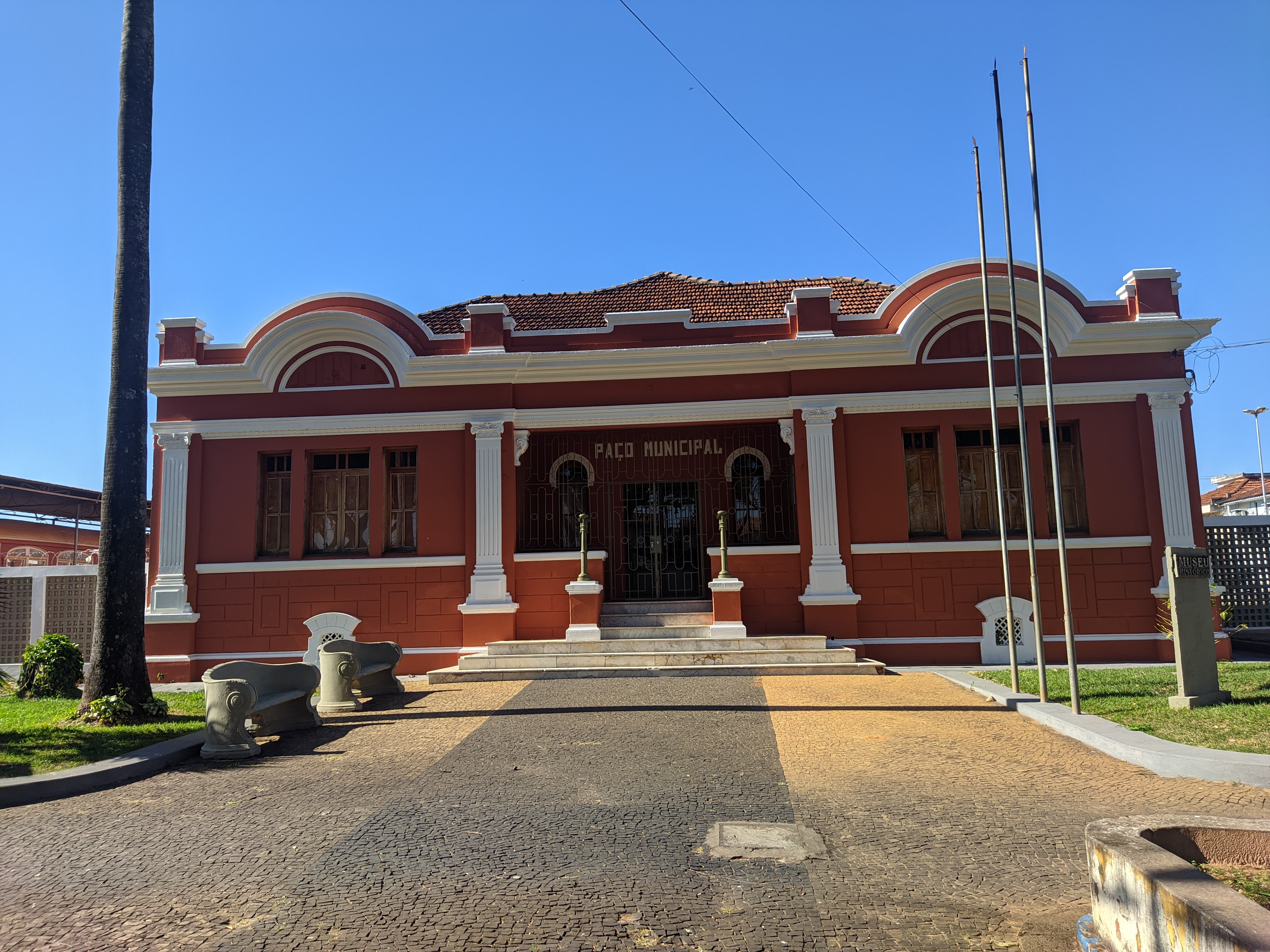
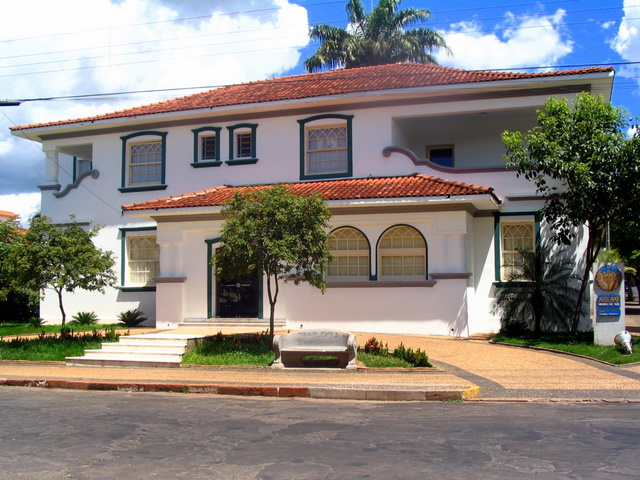
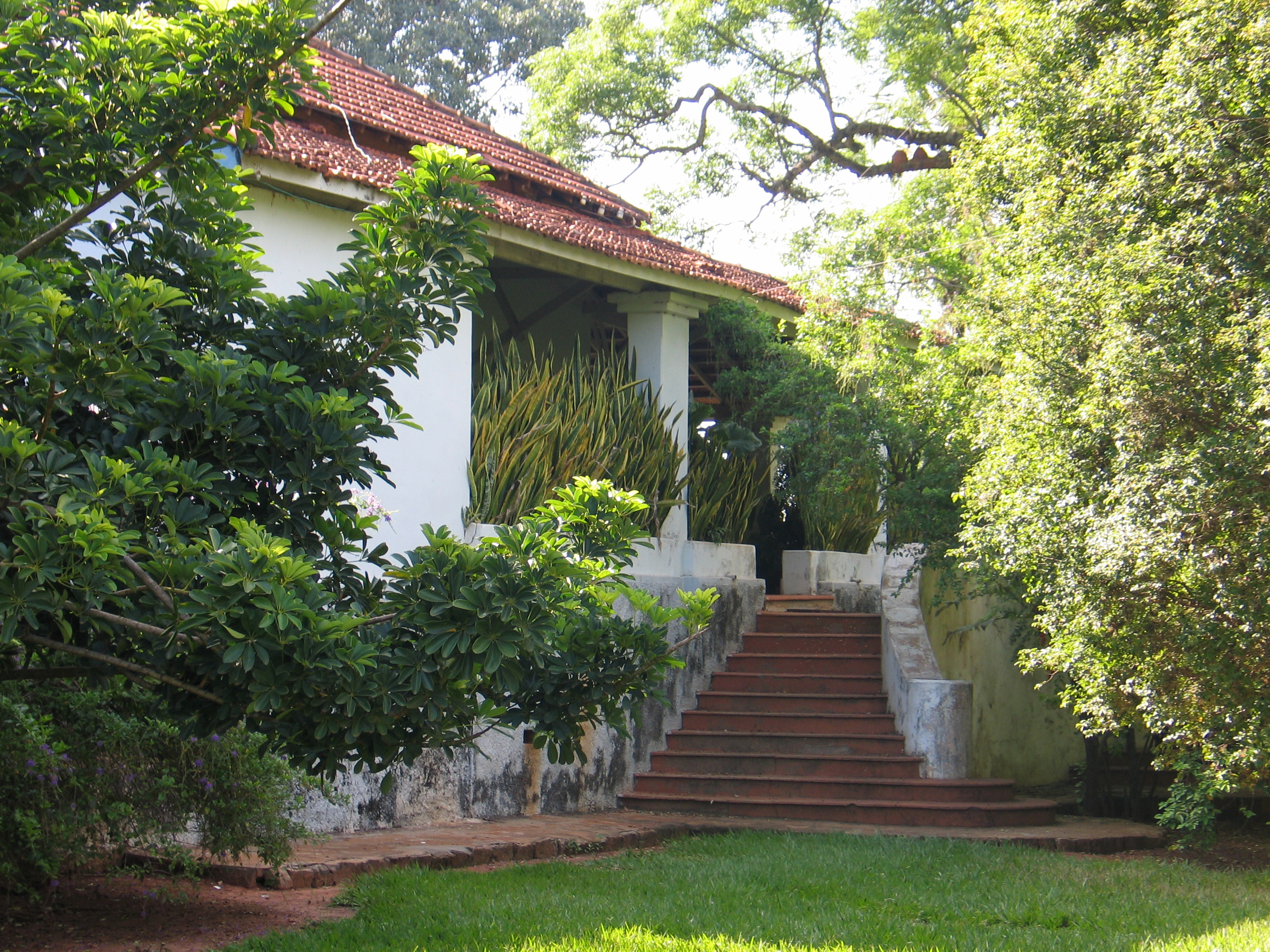
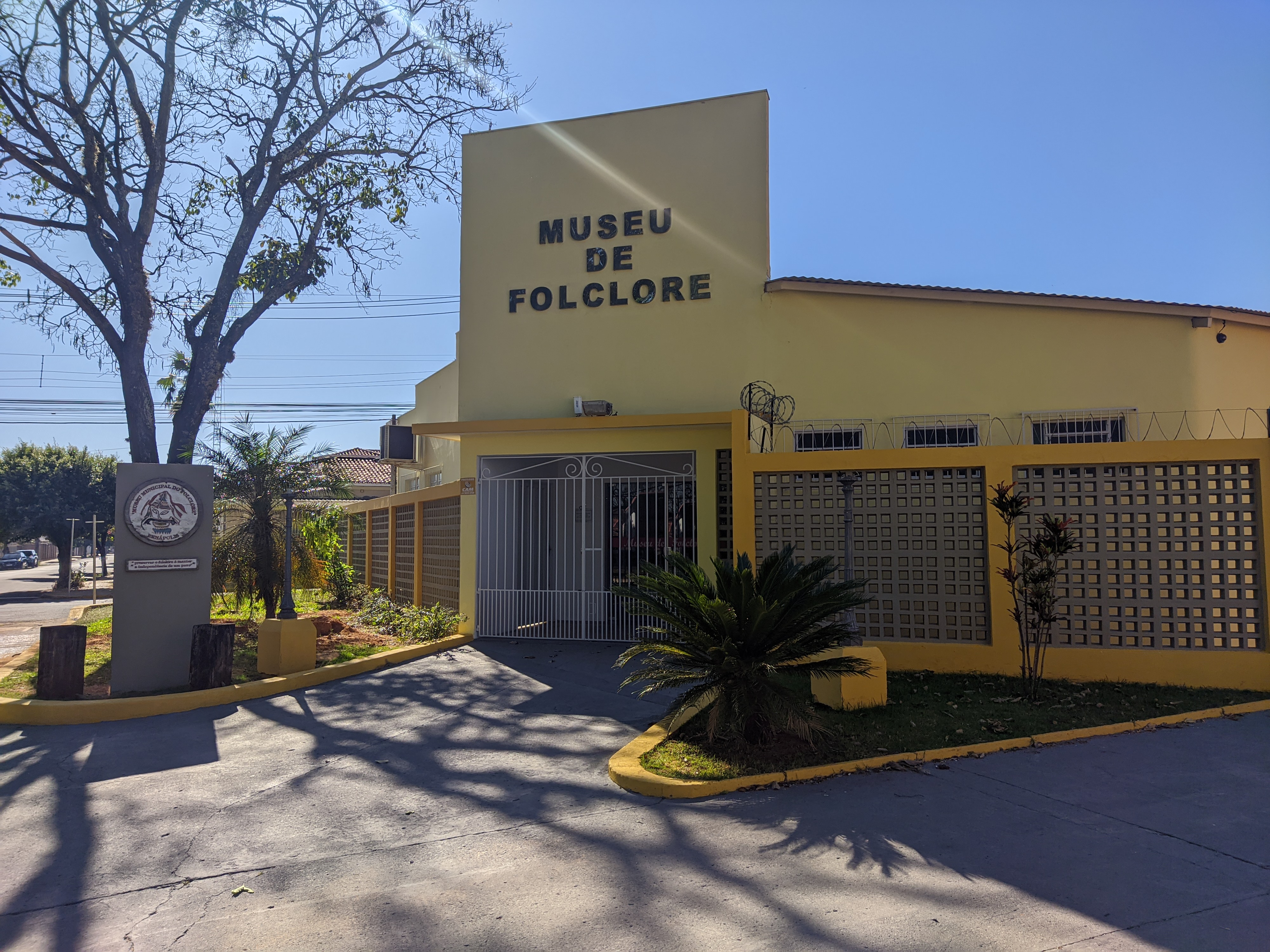
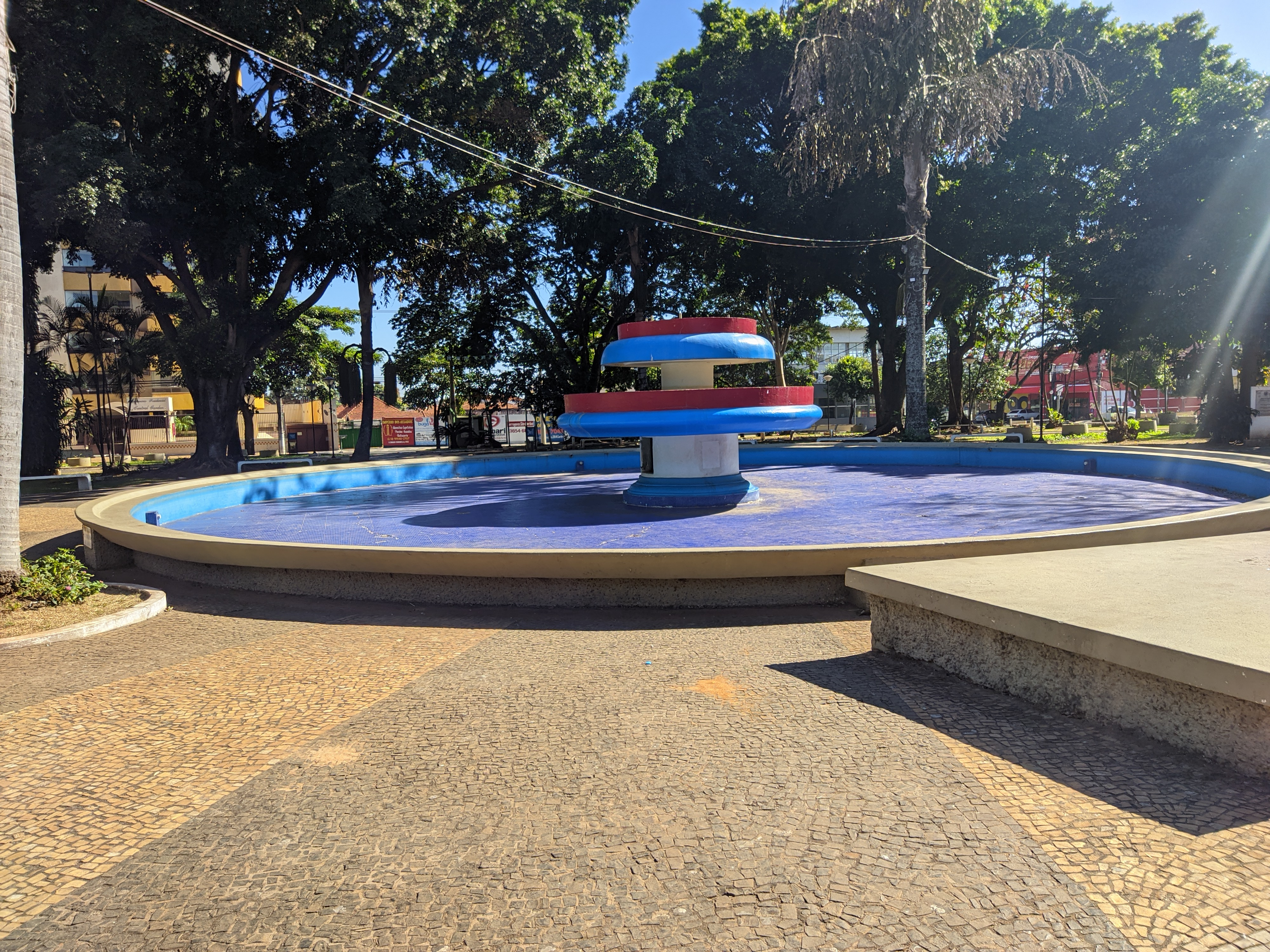
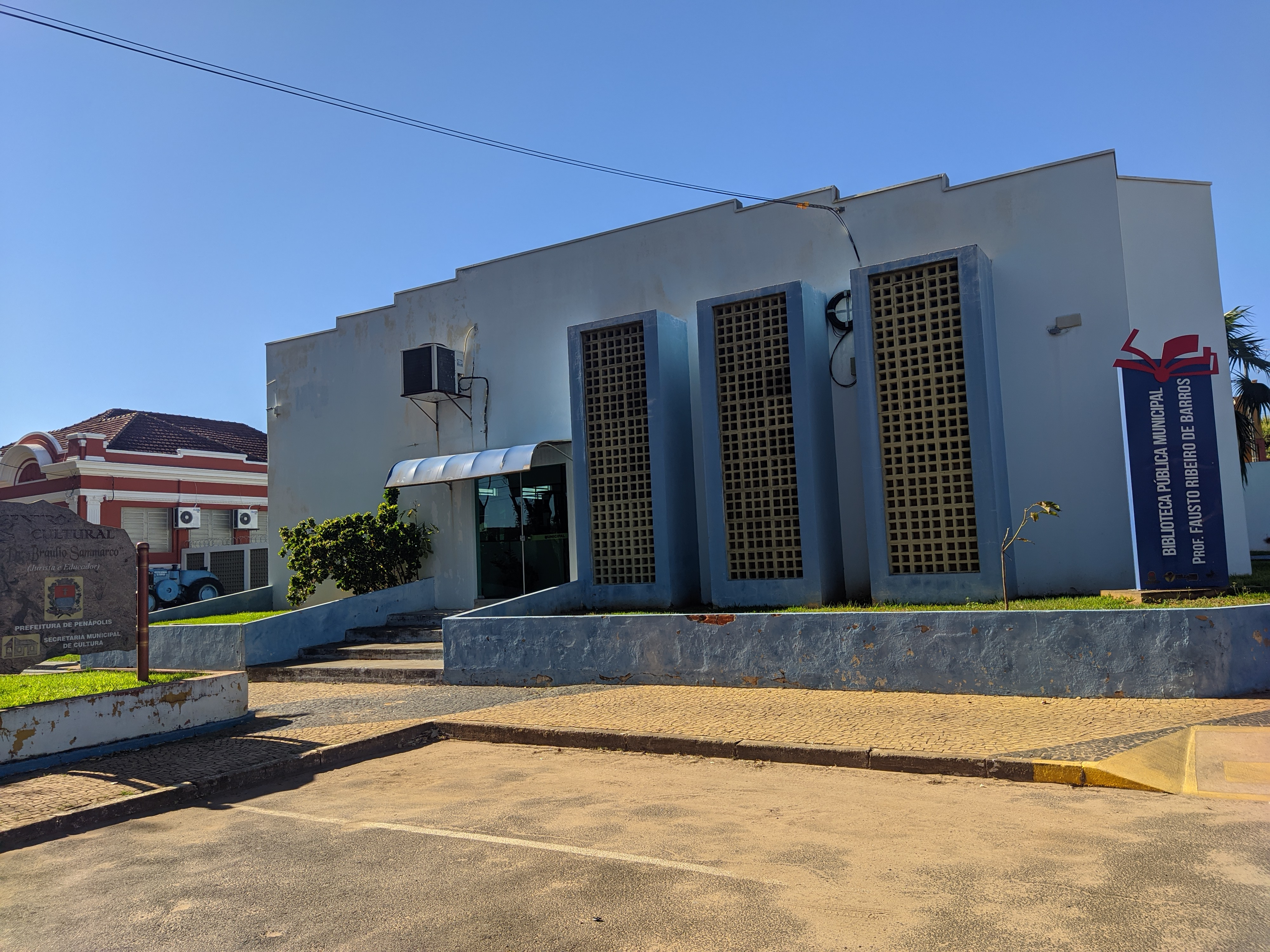

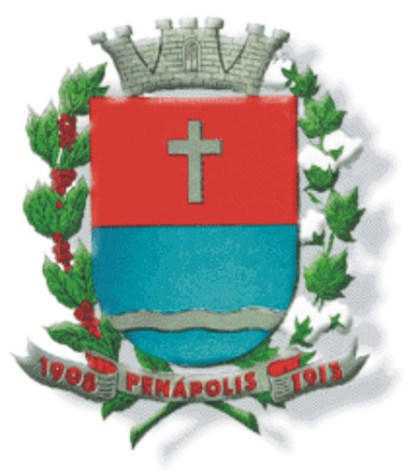
- Flag Coat of arms

- Location in São Paulo
- Coordinates: 21°25′11″S 50°04′39″W
- Country: Brazil
- Region: Southeast
- State: São Paulo
- Established: 2009

Government
  - Mayor: Caique Rossi

Area
  - Municipality: 7,113 km^{2} (2,746 sq mi)
  - Urban: 199 km^{2} (77 sq mi)
- Elevation: 416 m (1,365 ft)

Population (2021)
  - Municipality: 61.679
  - Density: 8,671/km^{2} (22,460/sq mi)
- IBGE
- Demonym: Penapolense
- Time zone: UTC−3 (BRT)
- Postal Code: 16300-000
- Area code: +55 18
- Website: www.penapolis.sp.gov.br

Penápolis is a municipality in the state of São Paulo, Brazil. The population as of the 2022 census was of 61.679 inhabitants. The city has an area of 710.8 km^{2} (274.4 sq mi).

== Historical formation ==
The region was first populated by the Crowned Indians (or Kaingang or still Caingangue). The first presence of the Brazilian State in the region was, in the end of the 19th century, a military colony in the Salto do Avanhandava, that was nicknamed "Banishment".

The Patrimony appeared in donated lands, in 1906, by the Farmer Eduardo Jose de Castilho, to the priests Capuchinhos. These and the enterprising colonel Manuel Bento de a Cruz had established the Patrimony of Santa Cruz of the Avanhandava, on 25 October 1908.

Immediately afterwards, on 2 December 1908, the patrimony became a new town.

The pioneers had found its biggest obstacles in the attacks of the Indians and the malaria. The Indians alone finally had been pacified with the action of colonel Candido Rondon.

== Administrative history ==
On 17 November 1909, the patrimony was raised as a district, and became Vila de Penapolis, in honour to the just-deceased president Afonso Pena. It became a city on 22 December 1913. It was raised to a judicial district on 10 October 1917. The installation of the judicial district occurred on 27 July 1918.

The original territory of the city of Penápolis was vast, going until the River Paraná, but much of it was reduced with its successive dismemberments in new cities.

== Economy ==
At the beginning of its population boom, the forest, coffee, sugar cane, cattle industries, carriage and railroad transport were the base for the economy of the city. Later came the dairy industry. Currently it relies on alcohol-sugar agro-industry, an industrial district and a strong private educational sector.

== Cultural aspects ==
Little remained of the previous culture of the Crowned Indians. The city was, however, enriched with other Brazilian and European traditions, since immigrants of several European countries established there. Migration from Minas Gerais also introduced traditions of that region, in the form of candies, cheeses, and in artisanal activities related to the sugar cane culture.

The beaches at the edge of Tietê River, along with the artificial lakes created by the Nova Avanhandava Power Plant are major tourist attractions.

Famous people born in Penápolis include: the Bishop of the Diocese of Duke of Caxias, Dom Mauro Morelli; the Bishop of the Armenian Church of São Paulo, Dom Vartan Waldir Boghossian; the actress Pepita Rodrigues and the composer and singer Francisco Gottardi (the Southerner), of the pair caipira Sulino & Marrueiro and Sabrina Sato, daughter of Omar Rahal and Kika Sato. She participated on Big Brother and since then became a celebrity. Now she is part of the cast of Panico, a comedy show on TV and radio.

== Media ==
In telecommunications, the city was served by Companhia Telefônica Brasileira until 1973, when it began to be served by Telecomunicações de São Paulo. In July 1998, this company was acquired by Telefónica, which adopted the Vivo brand in 2012.

The company is currently an operator of cell phones, fixed lines, internet (fiber optics/4G) and television (satellite and cable).

== Transportation ==
Penápolis is served by Dr. Ramalho Franco State Airport.

== See also ==
- List of municipalities in São Paulo
- Interior of São Paulo
