= Interior Open Games =

Annual sports competition in Brazil

Interior Open Games Jogos Abertos do Interior
- The flag of Jogos Abertos do Interior
- Status: Active
- Genre: Municipality sport event
- Years active: Annual
- Inaugurated: 1936 in Monte Alto
- Founder: Baby Barioni (founder)
- Next event: 2026 in Votuporanga

The Interior Open Games (Portuguese: Jogos Abertos do Interior) were created in 1936 in Monte Alto in the state of São Paulo, by Baby Barioni, for the creation of athletes in general.

== History ==
The history of the Interior Open Games began in 1936, when the first edition of the competition was organized in Monte Alto, in the interior of São Paulo. Leading this undertaking were Baby Barioni, a former basketball player for important clubs in the São Paulo, and Manuel Carvalho Lima, then president of the Associação Montealtense

Named the "Open Championship of the Interior," the competition brought together six cities that competed in basketball games: Monte Alto, Franca, Mirassol, Olímpia, Piracicaba, and Uberlândia. The title went to the city of Uberlândia in Minas Gerais, and Piracicaba came in second.

In 1937, the Open Games took place in Uberlândia. This was the only time the competition was held in a city outside the state of São Paulo. Once again, athletes from Minas Gerais won the title. That year, the novelty was the integration of swimming into the competitions.

The following year, 1938, the Open Games of the Interior gained the reinforcement of athletics competitions. In the competition held in Sorocaba, the city of Uberlândia won its third championship, curiously in its last participation. With three modalities, the event began to take on its current characteristics and opened space for the entry of more modalities, transforming itself into the biggest sporting event in the State of São Paulo, in which the greatest athletes in Brazil compete every year.

In 1939, with three sports already included, the games were held in Campinas. In 1940, there were already five sports included, in the games held in São Carlos, with the addition of Tennis and Target Shooting, and the cities had already created the Central Sports Commission in each municipality.

In 1956, the Bauru City Council authorized the Executive Branch to issue postage stamps commemorating the XXI Interior Open Games.

On May 15, 1957, a major inspection was carried out on the works at the venues where the 1957 Open Games of São Paulo were to be held in São Carlos, with the presence of the president and all the technical staff of DEFE.

In the 2018 games, there were competitions in 27 sports and 3 additional experimental sports, which may be incorporated in the future.

The Open Games of the Interior did not take place on only three occasions: 1989, when a strike by teachers in the state education system made it impossible to use state schools as accommodation, and 2020-2021 due to the COVID-19 pandemic.

In 2008, another important innovation was implemented: the separation of cities into two divisions. That year, 12 cities participated in the 1st division, while the rest were in the 2nd division.

In 2018, the games had impressive numbersImpressive how? To past IOGs or to the Olympics? Too vague and MOS:PEACOCK. Context required for this bold statemtent. in their realization in the city of São Carlos, when 217 delegations and 15,400 athletes participated and competed. The largest delegation with 598 members was that of the champion São José dos Campos, the second largest delegation with 391 members was that of the host city, which finished in 9th place. The city of Santos is the biggest winner of the Games, having won 26 editions.

== Editions ==
Year	Edition	Host City	Winner	Vice-campeã	3º colocado	4º colocado	Ref.
1936	1	Monte Alto	Uberlândia-MG	Piracicaba	Franca	Olímpia
1937	2	Uberlândia-MG	Uberlândia-MG	Amparo	Franca	Sorocaba
1938	3	Sorocaba	Uberlândia-MG	Campinas	Sorocaba	Franca
1939	4	Campinas	Campinas	Santos	Jundiaí	Sorocaba
1940	5	São Carlos	Santos	Campinas	Piracicaba	São Carlos
1941	6	Ribeirão Preto	Santos	Ribeirão Preto	Guaratinguetá	Campinas
1942	7	Ribeirão Preto	Santos	Ribeirão Preto	Campinas	Piracicaba
1943	8	Sorocaba	Santos	Campinas	Sorocaba	Bauru
1944	9	Taubaté	Santos	Taubaté	Bauru	Uberlândia
1945	10	Campinas	Santos	Campinas	Bauru	Taubaté
1946	11	Santos	Santos	Campinas	Bauru	Ribeirão Preto
1947	12	Ribeirão Preto	Santos	Ribeirão Preto	Campinas	Marília
1948	13	Santos	Santos	Ribeirão Preto	Campinas	Marília
1949	14	Rio Claro	Santos	Ribeirão Preto	Campinas	Rio Claro
1950	15ª	Sorocaba	Santos	Campinas	Sorocaba	Ribeirão Preto
1951	16ª	Santos	Santos	Campinas	Ribeirão Preto	Rio Claro
1952	17ª	Ribeirão Preto	Santos	Ribeirão Preto	Campinas	Rio Claro
1953	18ª	Jundiaí	Santos	Campinas	Jundiaí	Araraquara
1954	19ª	Sorocaba	Santos	Sorocaba	Campinas	Araraquara
1955	20ª	Piracicaba	Campinas	Rio Claro	Sorocaba	Piracicaba
1956	21ª	Bauru	Campinas	Bauru	–	–
1957	22ª	São Carlos	Santos	Campinas	Bauru	São Carlos
1958	23ª	Piracicaba	Campinas	São José do Rio Preto	São Carlos/Jundiaí	Piracicaba / Santo André
1959	24ª	Santo André	Santos	Santo André	–	–
1960	25ª	Campinas	Campinas	Uberlândia	–	–
1961	26ª	Jundiaí	Jundiaí	Campinas	–	–
1962	27ª	Marília	Santos	Bauru; Jundiaí	Piracicaba	São José do Rio Preto
1963	28ª	São José do Rio Preto	Santos	São José do Rio Preto	–	–
1964	29ª	São Caetano do Sul	Santos	Santo André	–	–
1965	30ª	Santos	Santos	Santo André	–	–
1966	31ª	Rio Claro	Santos	Santo André	–	–
1967	32ª	São José dos Campos	Santos	Santo André	–	–
1968	33ª	Jaboticabal	Santos	São José dos Campos	–	–
1969	34ª	Araraquara	São José dos Campos	São Bernardo do Campo	–	–
1970	35ª	Bauru	Santo André	Bauru	–	–
1971	36ª	Tupã	Campinas	Santo André	Bauru	–
1972	37ª	Osasco	Santo André	Bauru	–	–
1973	38ª	São Bernardo do Campo	São Bernardo do Campo	Santo André	–	–
1974	39ª	Franca	Campinas	Santos	Bauru	–
1975	40ª	Pirassununga	Campinas	Santos	Bauru	–
1976	41ª	Tupã	Santo André	Campinas	–	–
1977	42ª	São José dos Campos	Santo André	Campinas	–	–
1978	43ª	Americana	Campinas	Santo André	Bauru	–
1979	44ª	Araçatuba	Campinas	Santo André	Bauru	–
1980	45ª	Presidente Prudente	Santo André	Campinas	–	–
1981	46ª	Ribeirão Preto	Santo André	Campinas	–	–
1982	47ª	Rio Claro	São Caetano do Sul	São Bernardo do Campo	Bauru	–
1983	48ª	São José do Rio Preto	Santo André	Campinas	–	–
1984	49ª	Araçatuba	Santo André	São Bernardo do Campo	–	–
1985	50ª	Santo André	Santo André	Campinas	–	–
1986	51ª	Rio Claro	Santo André	Campinas	–	–
1987	52ª	Santos	Santos	Piracicaba	–	–
1988	53ª	Piracicaba	Santo André	Piracicaba	–	–
1989	Not held in 1989
1990	54ª	Araçatuba	Guarulhos	Santos	–	–
1991	55ª	Americana	Guarulhos	São Caetano do Sul	–	–
1992	56ª	Presidente Prudente	Guarulhos	São Caetano do Sul	–	–
1993	57ª	Guarulhos	Guarulhos	Santos	–	–
1994	58ª	Campinas	Guarulhos	Campinas	–	–
1995	59ª	São José do Rio Preto	Guarulhos	Santo André	–	–
1996	60ª	Bragança Paulista	Santo André	Guarulhos	–	–
1997	61ª	Bragança Paulista	São Caetano do Sul	Santos	–	–
1998	62ª	Araçatuba	São Caetano do Sul	Santos	–	–
1999	63ª	Araraquara	São Caetano do Sul	Santos	–	–
2000	64ª	Santos	São Caetano do Sul	Santos	–	–
2001	65ª	São José do Rio Preto	São Caetano do Sul	Santos	–	–
2002	66ª	Franca	São Caetano do Sul	Santos	–	–
2003	67ª	Santos	Santos	São Caetano do Sul	–	–
2004	68ª	Barretos	São Caetano do Sul	São José dos Campos	–	–
2005	69ª	Botucatu	São Caetano do Sul	Santos	–	–
2006	70ª	São Bernardo do Campo	São Caetano do Sul	São Bernardo do Campo	–	–
2007	71ª	Praia Grande	São Caetano do Sul	São Bernardo do Campo	–	–
2008	72ª	Piracicaba	São Caetano do Sul	São Bernardo do Campo	–	–
2009	73ª	São Caetano do Sul	São Caetano do Sul	São José dos Campos	–	–
2010	74ª	Santos	São Caetano do Sul	Santos	–	–
2011	75ª	Mogi das Cruzes	São Bernardo do Campo	São José dos Campos	–	–
2012	76ª	Bauru	São Caetano do Sul	São José dos Campos	–	–
2013	77ª	Mogi das Cruzes	São Bernardo do Campo	São José dos Campos	–	–
2014	78ª	Bauru	São José dos Campos	Piracicaba	–	–
2015	79ª	Barretos	São Bernardo do Campo	São José dos Campos	Piracicaba	Sertãozinho
2016	80ª	São Bernardo do Campo	São Bernardo do Campo	São José dos Campos	Piracicaba	Santos / Mogi das Cruzes
2017	81ª	São Bernardo do Campo; São Caetano do Sul; Santo André; Mauá; Ribeirão Pires	São José dos Campos	São Bernardo do Campo	São Caetano do Sul	Mogi das Cruzes
2018	82ª	São Carlos	São José dos Campos	São Bernardo do Campo	Santos	Jundiaí / Sorocaba
2019	83ª	Marília	São José dos Campos	Santos	São Caetano do Sul	Sorocaba / São José do Rio Preto
2020	Not held in COVID-19
2021	Not held in COVID-19
2022	84ª	São Sebastião	São José dos Campos	Santos	São Caetano do Sul	Sorocaba
2023	85ª	São José do Rio Preto	São José dos Campos	Santos	São Caetano do Sul	Pindamonhangaba
2024	86ª	São José do Rio Preto	São José dos Campos	Santos	São José do Rio Preto	Sorocaba
2025	87ª	Ribeirão Preto	São José dos Campos	Santos	Sorocaba	São José do Rio Preto
2026	88ª	Votuporanga	TBA	TBA	TBA	TBA

== Sports ==
- Archery ()
- Aquatics ()
  - Swimming
  - Biribol
- Athletics ()
- Badminton ()
- Basketball ()
  - Basketball 3x3
- Bench press ()
- Bocce ()
- Boxing ()
- Capoeira ()
- Checkers ()
- Chess (game) ()
- Cycling ()
  - BMX racing (2017)
  - Mountain biking (2017)
- Football ()
  - Futsal
- Freestyle wrestling ()
- Gymnastics ()
  - Artistic gymnastics
  - Rhythmic gymnastics
- Handball ()
- Jujutsu ()
- Judo ()
- Karate ()
- Kickboxing ()
- Malhe sport ()
- Taekwondo ()
- Tennis ()
  - Table tennis (2008—)
- Volleyball ()
  - Beach volleyball

=== Disabled sports ===
- Para-athletics ()
- Para swimming ()
- Para table tennis (2008) ()

=== Other sports ===
- Baseball (2011) ()
- Rugby union (2011) ()
- Rowing (2007,2010) ()
- Skateboarding (2017) ()
- Strongman (2011) ()
- Kyokushin (2011) ()
- Water polo (2010) ()
- Beach tennis (2011) ()
- Shooting ()
- Beach handball (2007) ()
- Surfing (2007) ()
- Beach soccer (2007) ()
- Canoeing (2007) ()
- Tamburello (2010) ()
- Sailing ()
