= Volleyball =

Team sport

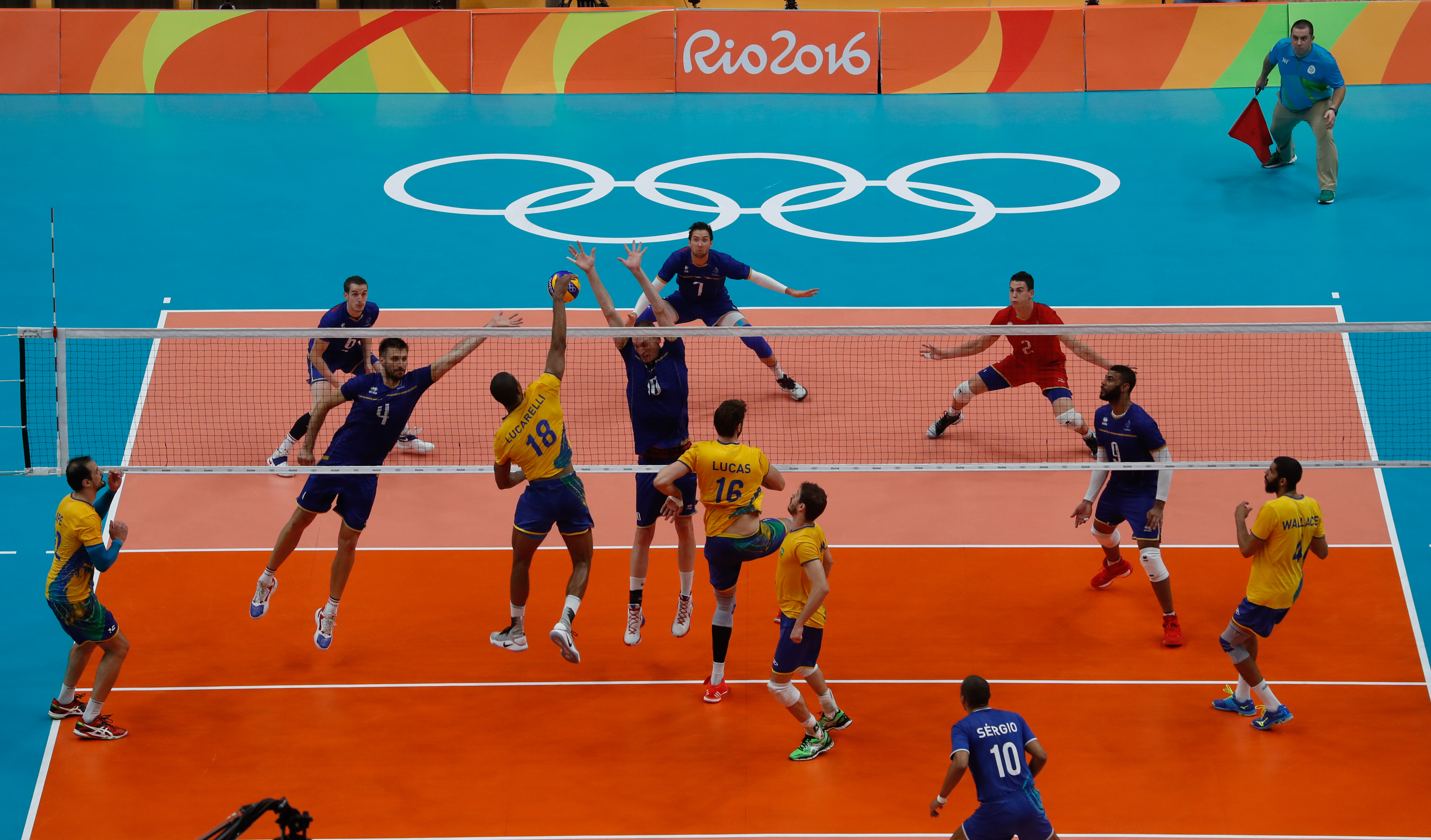
- A volleyball game during the 2016 Summer Olympics between France and Brazil
- Highest governing body: FIVB
- First played: 1895 in Holyoke, Massachusetts, U.S.

Characteristics
- Contact: None
- Team members: 6
- Mixed-sex: Single
- Type: Team sport, Net sport
- Equipment: Volleyball
- Glossary: Glossary of volleyball

Presence
- Country or region: Worldwide
- Olympic: 1964

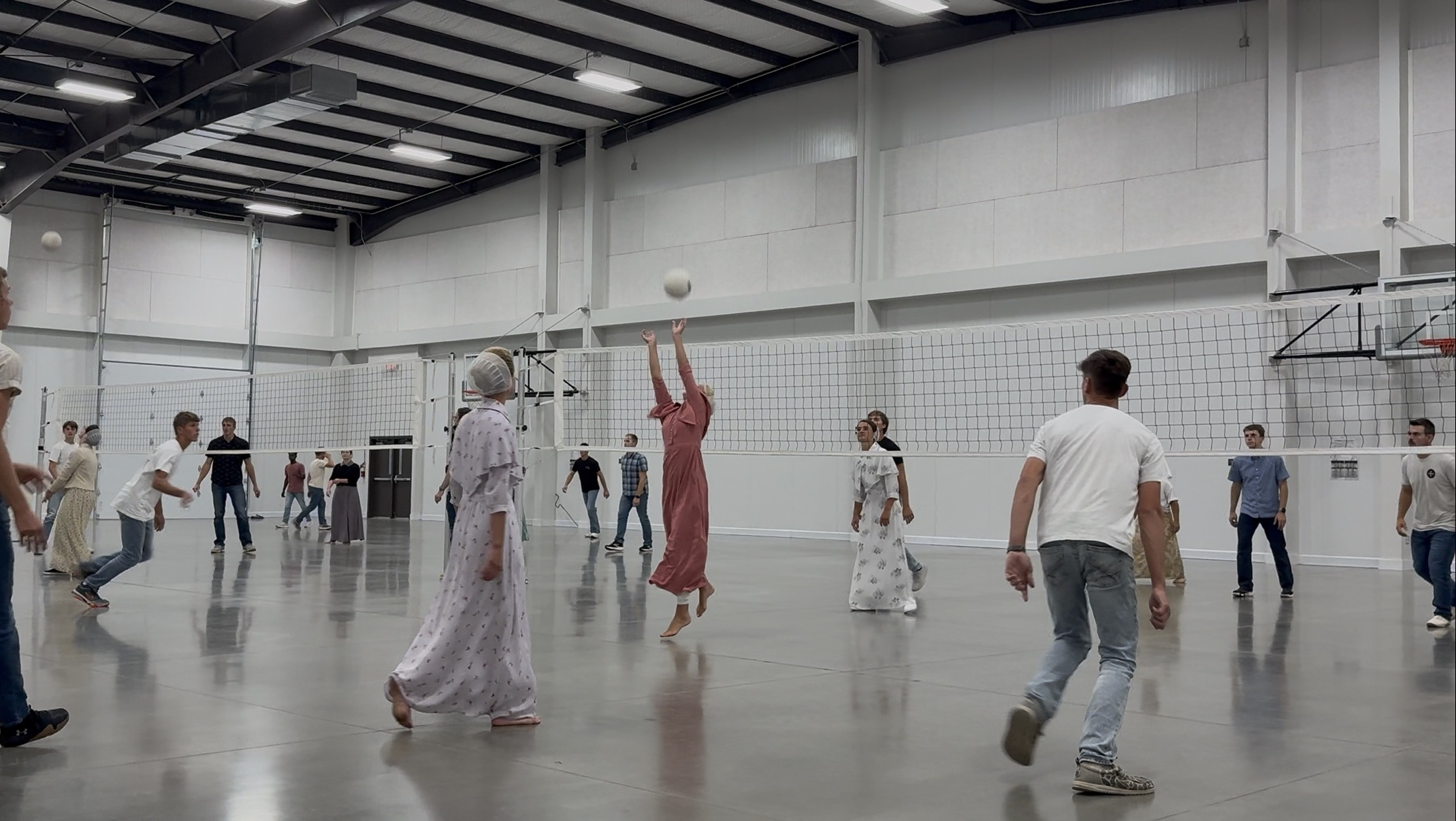
Schwarzenau Brethren of the Old German Baptist Brethren, New Conference playing volleyball at Brethren Heritage School in Modesto, California

Volleyball is a team sport in which two teams of six players are separated by a net. Each team tries to score points by grounding a ball on the other team's court under organized rules. It has been part of the official program of the Summer Olympic Games since Tokyo 1964. Beach volleyball was introduced to the program at the Atlanta 1996 Summer Olympics. The adapted version of volleyball at the Summer Paralympic Games is sitting volleyball.

Volleyball was invented in 1895 by the American educator William G. Morgan, a YMCA physical education director in Holyoke, Massachusetts. Morgan intended the game, which he originally called "mintonette", to be an alternative to basketball that was less physically demanding. It spread rapidly through YMCA networks in the United States and abroad. An international governing body, the Fédération Internationale de Volleyball (FIVB), was established in 1947, and the sport grew into a global phenomenon. Its social history has included diverse communities such as Christian members of the YMCA, nudists and, more recently, debates over inclusion and fairness regarding transgender athletes.

== Basic play ==
The complete set of rules is extensive, but play essentially proceeds as follows: a player on one of the teams begins a 'rally' by serving the ball (tossing or releasing it and then hitting it with a hand or arm), from behind the back boundary line of the court, over the net, and into the receiving team's court. The receiving team must not let the ball be grounded within their court. The team may touch the ball up to three times to return the ball to the other side of the court, but individual players may not touch the ball twice consecutively. Typically, the first two touches are used to set up for an attack. An attack is an attempt to direct the ball back over the net in such a way that the team receiving the ball is unable to pass the ball and continue the rally, thus, losing the point. The team that wins the rally is awarded a point and serves the ball to start the next rally. A few of the most common faults include:

- causing the ball to touch the ground or floor outside the opponents' court or without first passing over the net;
- catching and throwing the ball;
- double hit: two consecutive contacts with the ball made by the same player;
- four consecutive contacts with the ball made by the same team;
- net foul: a player touching the net during play;
- foot fault: the foot crosses over the boundary line when serving or under the net when a front row player is trying to keep the ball in play.

The ball is usually played with the hands or arms, but players can legally strike or push (short contact) the ball with any part of the body.

A number of consistent techniques have evolved in volleyball, including spiking and blocking (because those plays are made above the top of the net, the vertical jump is an athletic skill emphasized in the sport) as well as passing, setting, and specialized player positions. Offensive and defensive structures are also key plays.

== History ==
=== Origins ===
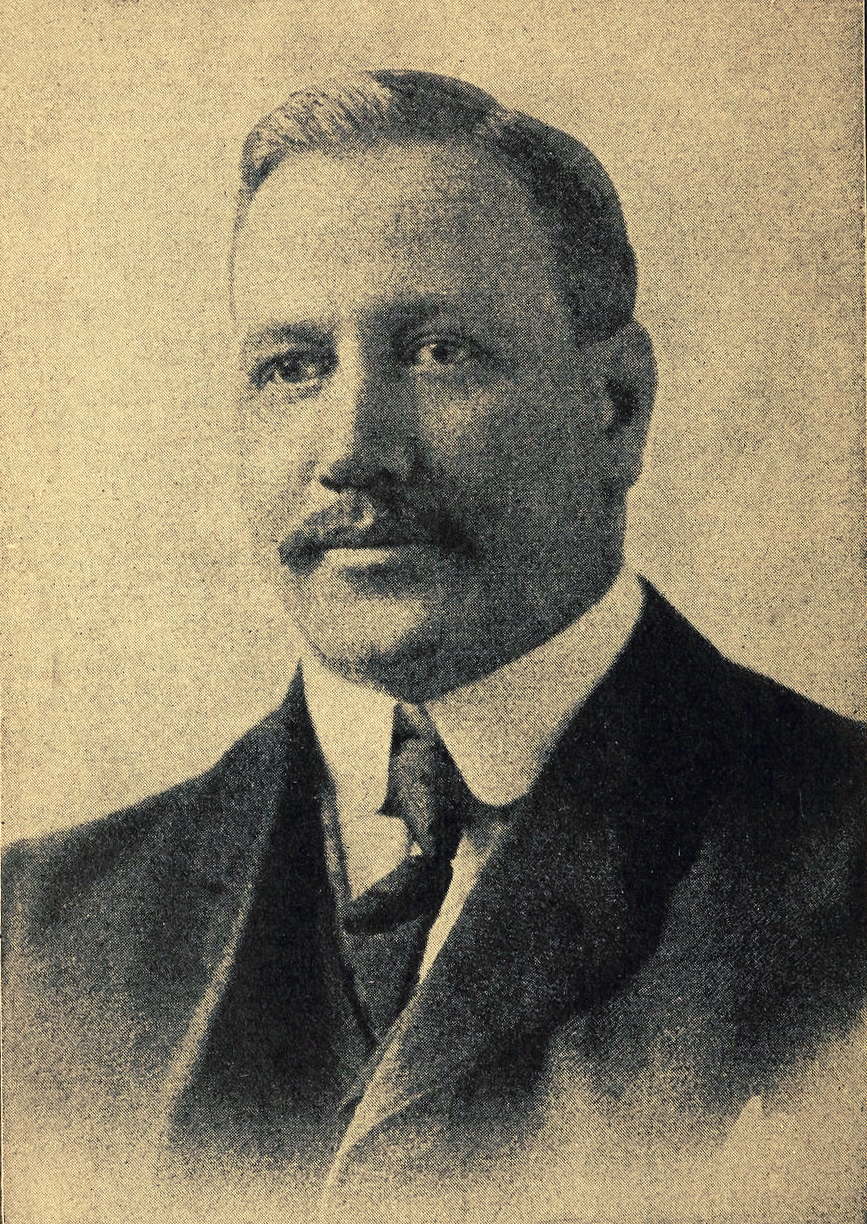
William G. Morgan c. 1915

William G. Morgan invented the sport in 1895 while he was the YMCA physical education director in Holyoke, Massachusetts. Because he originally derived the game from badminton, he initially named the sport mintonette. He was a one-time student of basketball inventor James Naismith and invented the game for his clients at the YMCA, most of whom were middle-aged businessmen for whom the physical demands of basketball were too great.

The first rules, written down by Morgan, called for a net 6 ft 6 in (1.98 m) high, a 25 ft × 50 ft (7.6 m × 15.2 m) court, and any number of players. A match was composed of nine innings with three serves for each team in each inning, and no limit to the number of ball contacts for each team before sending the ball to the opponents' court. In case of a serving error, a second try was allowed. Hitting the ball into the net was considered a foul (with loss of the point or a side-out)—except in the case of the first-try serve.

After an observer, Alfred Halstead, noticed the volleying nature of the game at its first exhibition match in 1896, played at the International YMCA Training School (now called Springfield College), the game quickly became known as volleyball (it was originally spelled as two words: "volley ball"). Volleyball rules were slightly modified by the International YMCA Training School and the game spread around the country to various YMCAs.

In the early 1900s, Spalding, through its publishing company American Sports Publishing Company, produced books with complete instruction and rules for the sport.

=== Refinements and later developments ===
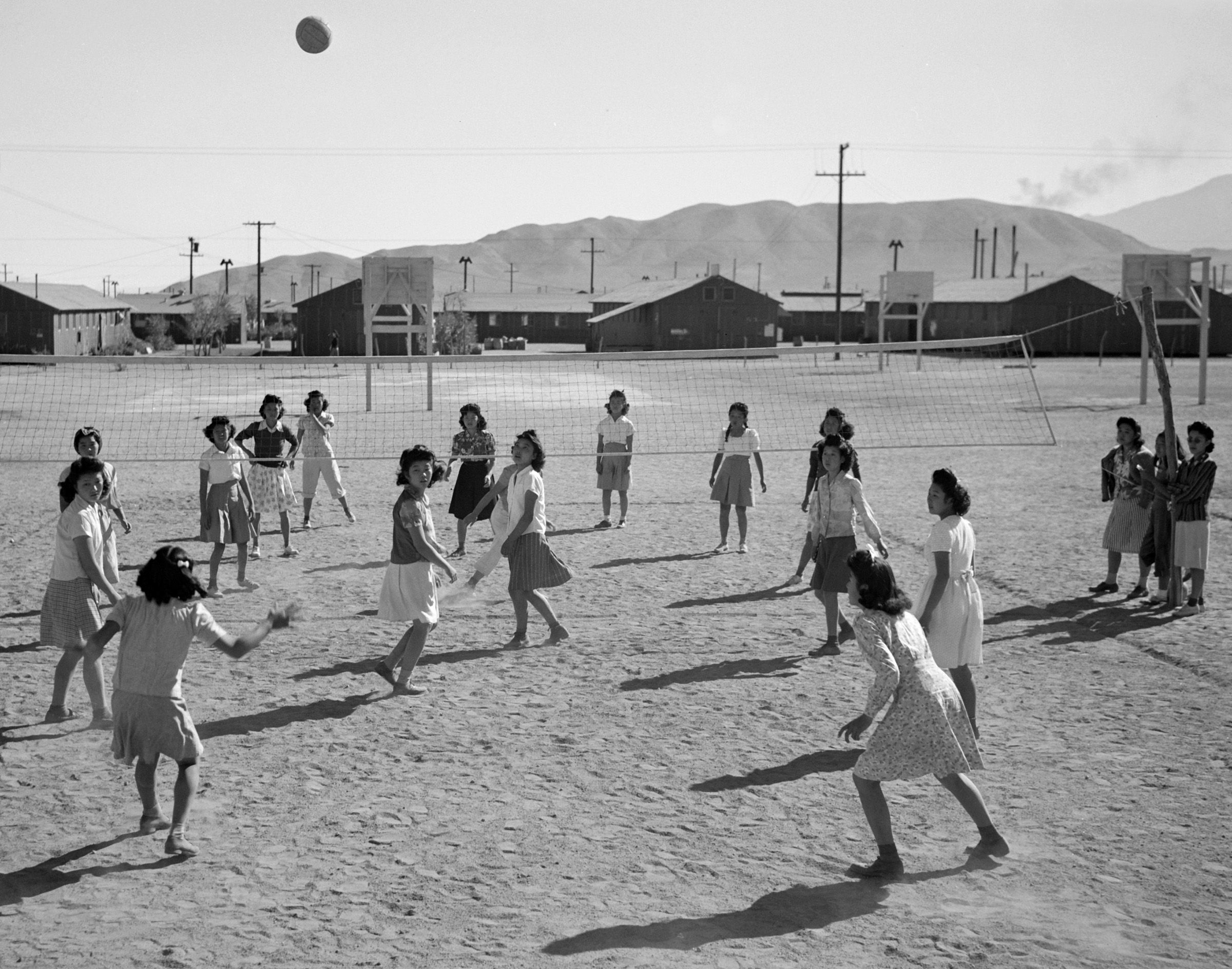
Japanese American women playing volleyball at the Manzanar internment camp during World War II in c. 1943

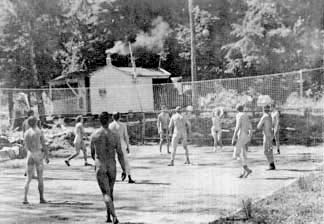
A nudist/naturist volleyball game at the Sunny Trails Club during the 1958 Canadian Sunbathing Association (CSA) convention in British Columbia, Canada

The first official ball used in volleyball is disputed; some sources say Spalding created the first official ball in 1896, while others claim it was created in 1900. The rules evolved over time: in 1916, in the Philippines, the skill and power of the set and spike had been introduced, and four years later a "three hits" rule and a rule against hitting from the back row were established. In 1917, the game was changed from requiring 21 points to win to a smaller 15 points to win. In 1919, about 16,000 volleyballs were distributed by the American Expeditionary Forces to their troops and allies, which sparked the growth of volleyball in new countries.

Like basketball, volleyball spread quickly due to its simplicity and promotion by the YMCA and YWCA. The first country outside the United States to adopt volleyball was Canada in 1900. During and after World War I, the presence of YMCA instructors in American forces led to the spread of volleyball in Europe, where clubs were established in France as well as several Soviet nations. An international federation, the Fédération Internationale de Volleyball (FIVB), was founded in 1947, and the first World Championships were held in 1949 for men and 1952 for women. The sport is now popular in Brazil, Europe(where especially Italy, the Netherlands, and Eastern Europe have been major forces since the late 1980s), Russia, Asia including China, and the United States.

Beach volleyball, a variation of the game played on sand and with only two players per team, became a FIVB-endorsed variation in 1987 and was added to the Olympic program at the 1996 Summer Olympics. Likely originating in 1915 on Waikiki Beach in Hawaii, beach volleyball is a game of volleyball played by two teams of two players on an outdoor sandy court. Volleyball is also a sport at the Paralympics managed by World ParaVolley.

Nudists were early adopters of the game with regular organized play in clubs as early as the late 1920s. By the 1960s, a volleyball court had become standard in almost all nudist/naturist clubs. Recently a debate has arisen within the sport regarding the inclusion of transgender players. With transgender athletes including Tiffany Abreu joining professional volleyball teams alongside other non-transgender teammates, many professionals, sports analysts, and fans of volleyball either express concerns about the legitimacy and fairness of having transgender players on a team or convey support for the transgender players.

=== Volleyball in the Olympics ===
Volleyball has been part of the Summer Olympics program for both men and women consistently since 1964.

== Rules of the game ==
A volleyball court

Rotation pattern

=== Court dimensions ===
A volleyball court is 9 m × 18 m (29.5 ft × 59.1 ft), divided into equal square halves by a net with a width of one meter (39.4 in). The top of the net is 2.43 m (7 ft 11 11/16 in) above the center of the court for men's competition, and 2.24 m (7 ft 4 3/16 in) for women's competition, varied for veterans and junior competitions.

The minimum height clearance for indoor volleyball courts is 7 m (23.0 ft), although a clearance of 8 m (26.2 ft) is recommended.

A line 3 m (9.8 ft) from and parallel to the net is considered the "attack line". This "3 meter" (or "10-foot") line divides the court into "back row" and "front row" areas and the back court and front court. These are in turn divided into 3 areas each: these are numbered as follows, starting from area "1", which is the position of the serving player:

After a team gains the serve (also known as siding out), its members must rotate in a clockwise direction, with the player previously in area "2" moving to area "1" and so on, with the player from area "1" moving to area "6". Each player rotates only one time after the team gains possession of the service; the next time each player rotates will be after the other team wins possession of the ball and loses the point.

The team courts are surrounded by an area called the free zone, which is at least 3 meters wide and may be entered and played within by the players after the service of the ball. All lines marking the boundaries of the team court and the attack zone are drawn or painted within the dimensions of the area and are therefore part of the court or zone. If a ball touches a line, it is considered "in." An antenna is placed on each side of the net, perpendicular to the sideline, serving as a vertical extension of the side boundary of the court. A ball passing over the net must pass completely between the antennae (or their theoretical extensions to the ceiling) without contacting them.

=== The ball ===
FIVB regulations state that the ball must be spherical, made of leather or synthetic leather, have a circumference of 65–67 cm (25.6–26.4 in), a weight of 260–280 g (9.2–9.9 oz) and an interior air pressure of 0.30–0.325 kg/cm^{2} (4.26 to 4.61 psi; 294.3 to 318.82 mbar or hPa). Other governing bodies have similar regulations.

=== Gameplay ===
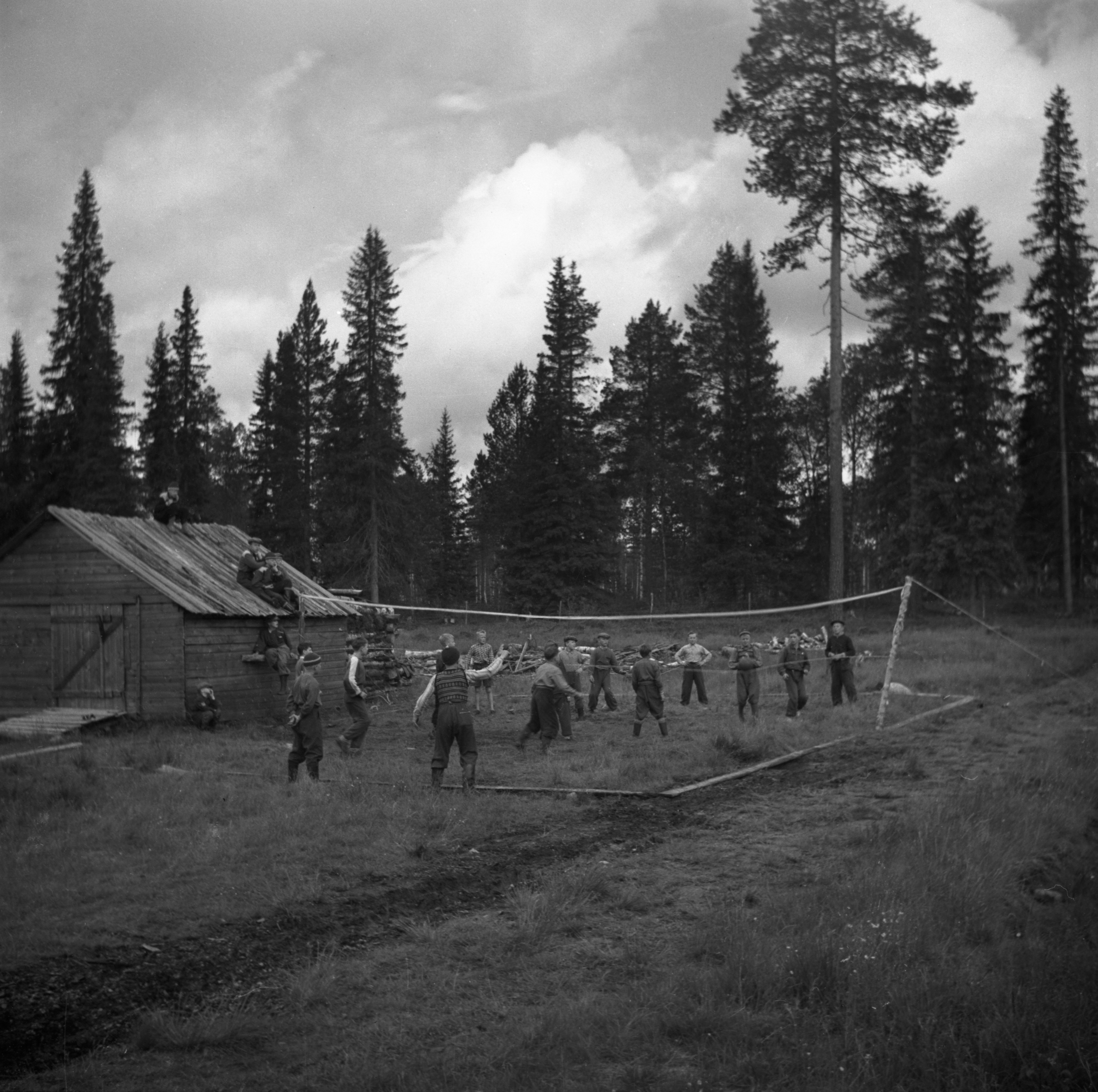
Finnish children playing volleyball in a rural area (1950s)

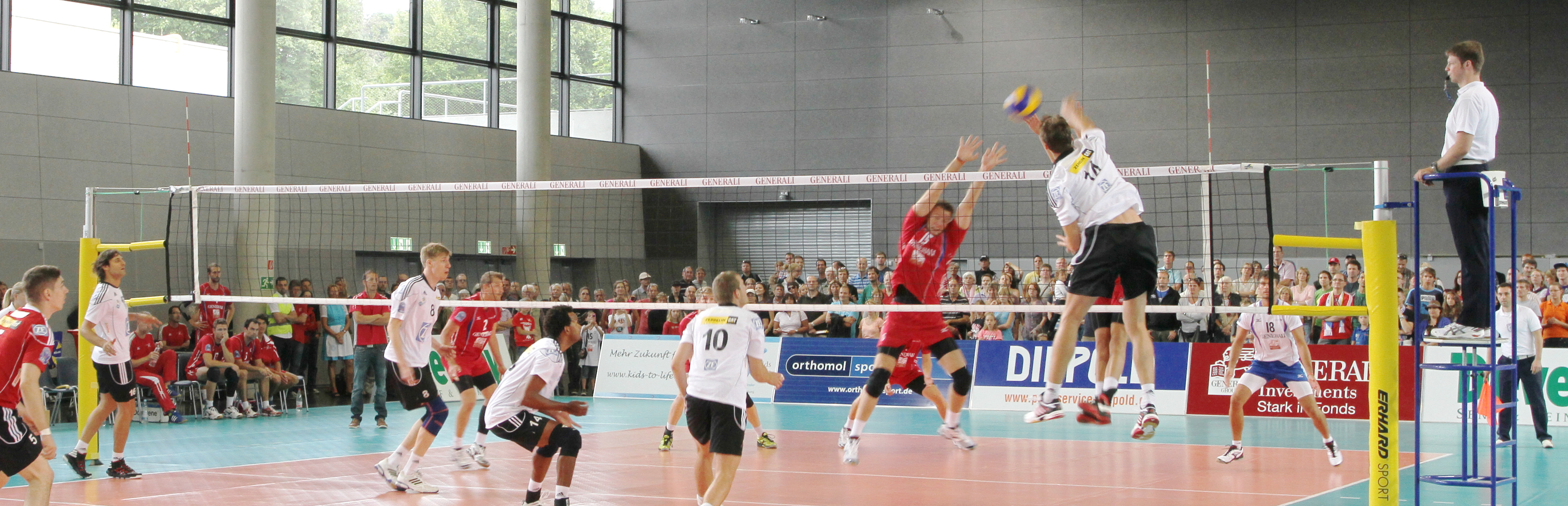
White is on the attack while red attempts to block.

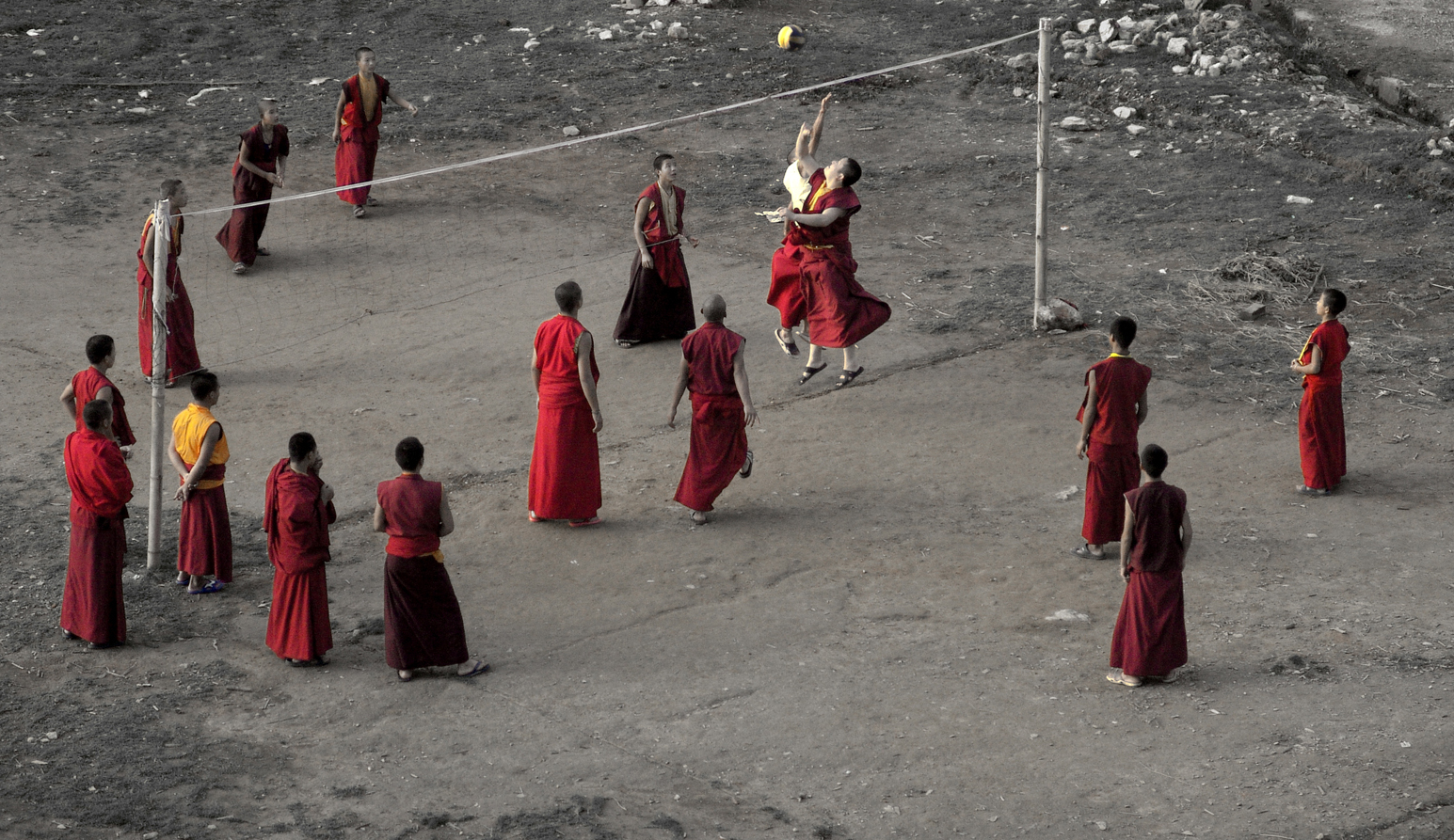
Buddhist monks play volleyball in the Himalayan state of Sikkim in India

Each team consists of six players. To get play started, a team is chosen to serve by coin toss. A player from the serving team throws the ball into the air and attempts to hit the ball so it passes over the net on a course such that it will land in the opposing team's court (the serve). The opposing team must use a combination of no more than three contacts with the volleyball to return the ball to the opponent's side of the net. These contacts usually consist first of the bump or pass so that the ball's trajectory is aimed towards the player designated as the setter; second of the set (usually an over-hand pass using wrists to push finger-tips at the ball) by the setter so that the ball's trajectory is aimed towards a spot where one of the players designated as an attacker can hit it, and third by the attacker who spikes (jumping, raising one arm above the head and hitting the ball so it will move quickly down to the ground on the opponent's court) to return the ball over the net. The team with possession of the ball that is trying to attack the ball as described is said to be on offense.

The team on defense attempts to prevent the attacker from directing the ball into their court: players at the net jump and reach above the top (and if possible, across the plane) of the net to block the attacked ball. If the ball is hit around, above, or through the block, the defensive players arranged in the rest of the court attempt to control the ball with a dig (usually a fore-arm pass of a hard-driven ball). After a successful dig, the team transitions to offence.

The game continues in this manner, rallying back and forth until the ball touches the court within the boundaries or until an error is made. The most frequent errors that are made are either to fail to return the ball over the net within the allowed three touches, or to cause the ball to land outside the court. A ball is "in" if any part of it touches the inside of a team's court or a sideline or end-line, and a strong spike may compress the ball enough when it lands that a ball which at first appears to be going out may instead be in. Players may travel well outside the court to play a ball that has gone over a sideline or end-line in the air. A standard competitive volleyball match is played in a best-of-five sets format and typically goes on for about 90 minutes.

Other common errors include a player touching the ball twice in succession, a player catching the ball, a player touching the net while attempting to play the ball, or a player penetrating under the net into the opponent's court. There are a large number of other errors specified in the rules, although most of them are infrequent occurrences. These errors include back-row or libero players spiking the ball or blocking (back-row players may spike the ball if they jump from behind the attack line), players not being in the correct position when the ball is served, attacking the serve in the front court and above the height of the net, using another player as a source of support to reach the ball, stepping over the back boundary line when serving, taking more than 8 seconds to serve, or playing the ball when it is above the opponent's court.

=== Scoring ===
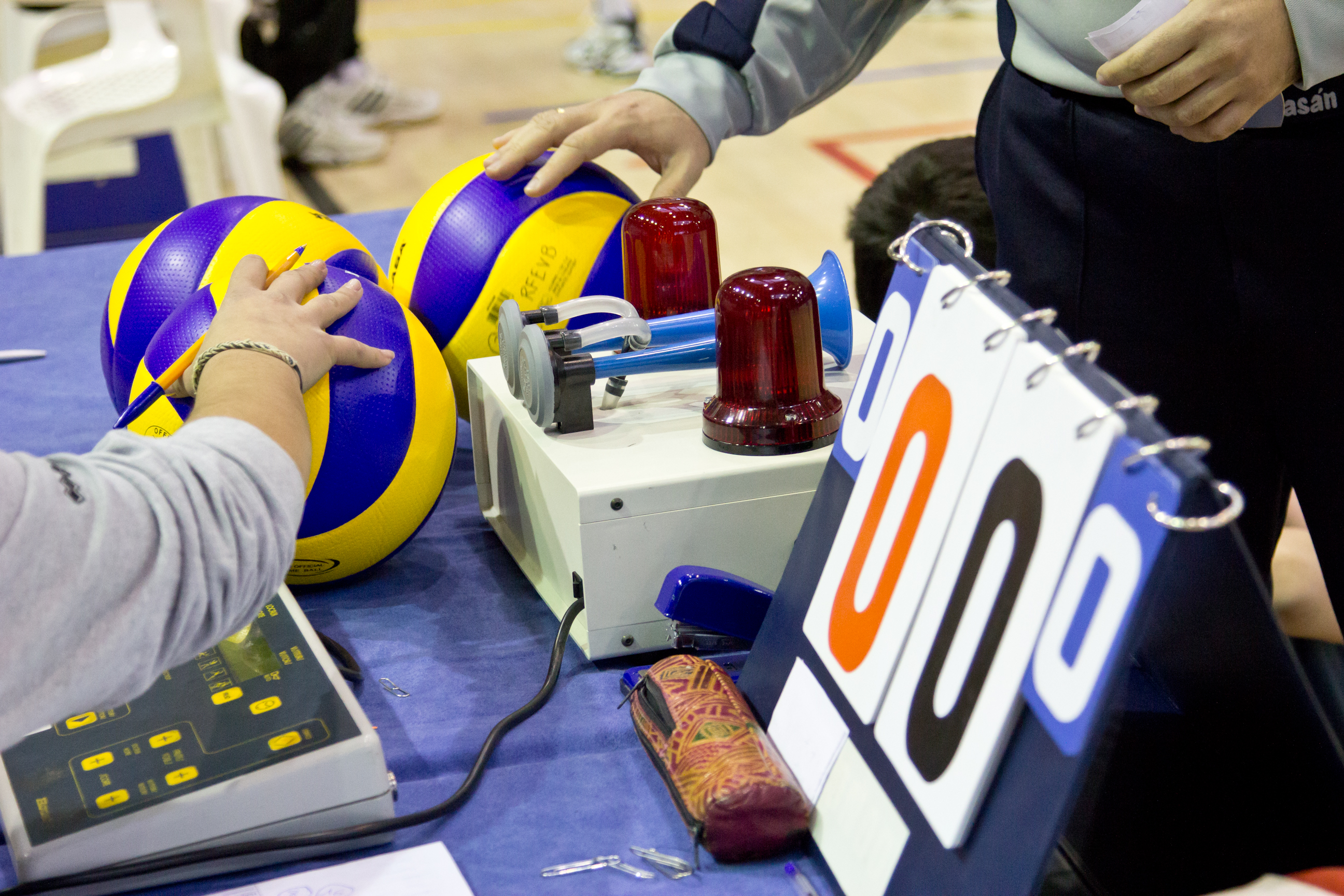
A scorer's table shown just before a volleyball game

A point is scored when the ball contacts the floor within the court boundaries or when an error is made: when the ball strikes one team's side of the court, the other team gains a point; and when an error is made, the team that did not make the error is awarded a point, in either case paying no regard to whether they served the ball or not. If any part of the ball hits the line, the ball is counted as in the court. The team that won the point serves for the next point. If the team which won the point served in the previous point, the same player serves again. If the team that won the point did not serve the previous point, the players of the team acquiring the serve rotate their position on the court in a clockwise manner. The game continues, with the first team to score 25 points by a two-point margin awarded the set. Matches are best-of-five sets and the fifth set, if necessary, is usually played to 15 points. (Scoring differs between leagues, tournaments, and levels; high schools sometimes play best-of-three to 25; in the NCAA matches are played best-of-five to 25 as of the 2008 season.)

Before 1999, points could be scored only when a team had the serve (side-out scoring) and all sets went up to only 15 points. The FIVB changed the rules in 1999 (with the changes being compulsory in 2000) to use the current scoring system (formerly known as rally point system), primarily to make the length of the match more predictable and to make the game more spectator- and television-friendly. The final year of side-out scoring at the NCAA Division I Women's Volleyball Championship was 2000. Rally point scoring debuted in 2001, and games were played to 30 points through 2007. For the 2008 season, games were renamed "sets" and reduced to 25 points to win. Most high schools in the U.S. changed to rally scoring in 2003, and several states implemented it the previous year on an experimental basis.

=== Libero ===
The libero player was introduced internationally in 1998, and made its debut for NCAA competition in 2002. The libero is a player specialized in defensive skills: the libero must wear a contrasting jersey color from their teammates and cannot block or attack the ball when it is entirely above net height. When the ball is not in play, the libero can replace any back-row player, without prior notice to the officials. This replacement does not count against the substitution limit each team is allowed per set, although the libero may be replaced only by the player whom they replaced. Most U.S. high schools added the libero position from 2003 to 2005.

The modern-day libero often takes on the role of a second setter. When the setter digs the ball, the libero is typically responsible for the second ball and sets to the front-row attacker. The libero may function as a setter only under certain restrictions. To make an overhand set, the libero must be standing behind (and not stepping on) the 3-meter line; otherwise, the ball cannot be attacked above the net in front of the 3-meter line. An underhand pass is allowed from any part of the court. The libero is generally the most skilled defensive player on the team. Additionally, there is a libero tracking sheet, where the referees or officiating team keep track of whom the libero substitutes in and out for.

Under international FIVB rules, the libero is not allowed to serve. However, some volleyball organizaions, including USA volleyball and the NCA, allow the libero to serve in one rotational position per set. That is, the libero can only serve for one person, not for all of the people for whom they go in. That rule change was implemented in 2004 and applied to high school and junior high play soon after.

Under FIVB rules, each team can designate two liberos at the beginning of play, only one of whom can be on the court at any time, and each libero can serve in one specific rotation. This rule was implemented in NCAA women's volleyball, effective with the fall 2024 season.

=== Rule changes ===
Rule changes enacted in 2000 include allowing serves in which the ball touches the net, as long as it goes over the net into the opponents' court. Also, the service area was expanded to allow players to serve from anywhere behind the end line but still within the theoretical extension of the sidelines. Other changes were made to lighten up calls on faults for carries and double-touches, such as allowing multiple contacts by a single player ("double-hits") on a team's first contact provided that they are part of a single play on the ball.

In 2008, the NCAA changed the minimum number of points needed to win any of the first four sets from 30 to 25 for women's volleyball (men's volleyball remained at 30 for another three years, switching to 25 in 2011). If a fifth (deciding) set is reached, the minimum required score remains at 15. In addition, the word "game" is now referred to as "set".

The Official Volleyball Rules are prepared and updated every few years by the FIVB's Rules of the Game and Refereeing Commission. The latest edition is usually available on the FIVB's website.

== Skills ==
Competitive teams master six basic skills: serve, pass, set, attack, block and dig. Each of the skills consists of a number of specific techniques which have been introduced over the years and are now considered standard practice in high-level volleyball.

=== Serve ===
A player making a jump serve

A float serve

A player stands behind the inline and serves the ball in an attempt to drive it into the opponent's court. The main objective is to make it land inside the court; it is also desirable to set the ball's direction, speed and acceleration so that it becomes difficult for the receiver to handle it properly. A serve is called an "ace" when the ball either lands directly onto the opponent's court or the first opponent to touch the ball is unable to volley it (hit it upwards enough for a teammate to continue).

In contemporary volleyball, many types of serves are employed:

- Underhand: a serve in which the player strikes the ball below the waist instead of tossing it up and striking it with an overhand throwing motion. Underhand serves are considered very easy to receive and are rarely employed in high-level competitions.
- Sky ball serve: a specific type of underhand serve occasionally used in beach volleyball, where the ball is hit so high it comes down almost in a straight line. This serve was invented and employed almost exclusively by the Brazilian team in the early 1980s and is now considered outdated. During the 2016 Olympic Games in Rio de Janeiro, however, the sky ball serve was extensively played by Italian beach volleyball player Adrian Carambula. In Brazil, this serve is called Jornada nas Estrelas (Star Trek).
- Topspin: an overhand serve where the player tosses the ball high and hits it with a wrist snap, giving it topspin which causes it to drop faster than it would otherwise and helps maintain a straight flight path. Topspin serves are generally hit hard and aimed at a specific returner or part of the court. Standing topspin serves are rarely used above the high school level of play.
- Float: an overhand serve where the ball is hit with no spin so that its path becomes unpredictable, akin to a knuckleball in baseball.
- Jump serve: an overhand serve where the ball is first tossed high in the air, then the player makes a timed approach and jumps to make contact with the ball, hitting it with much pace and topspin. This is the most popular serve among college and professional teams.
- Jump float: an overhand serve where the ball is tossed high enough that the player may jump before hitting it similarly to a standing float serve. The ball is tossed lower than a topspin jump serve, but contact is still made while in the air. This serve is becoming more popular among college and professional players because it has a certain unpredictability in its flight pattern.

=== Pass ===
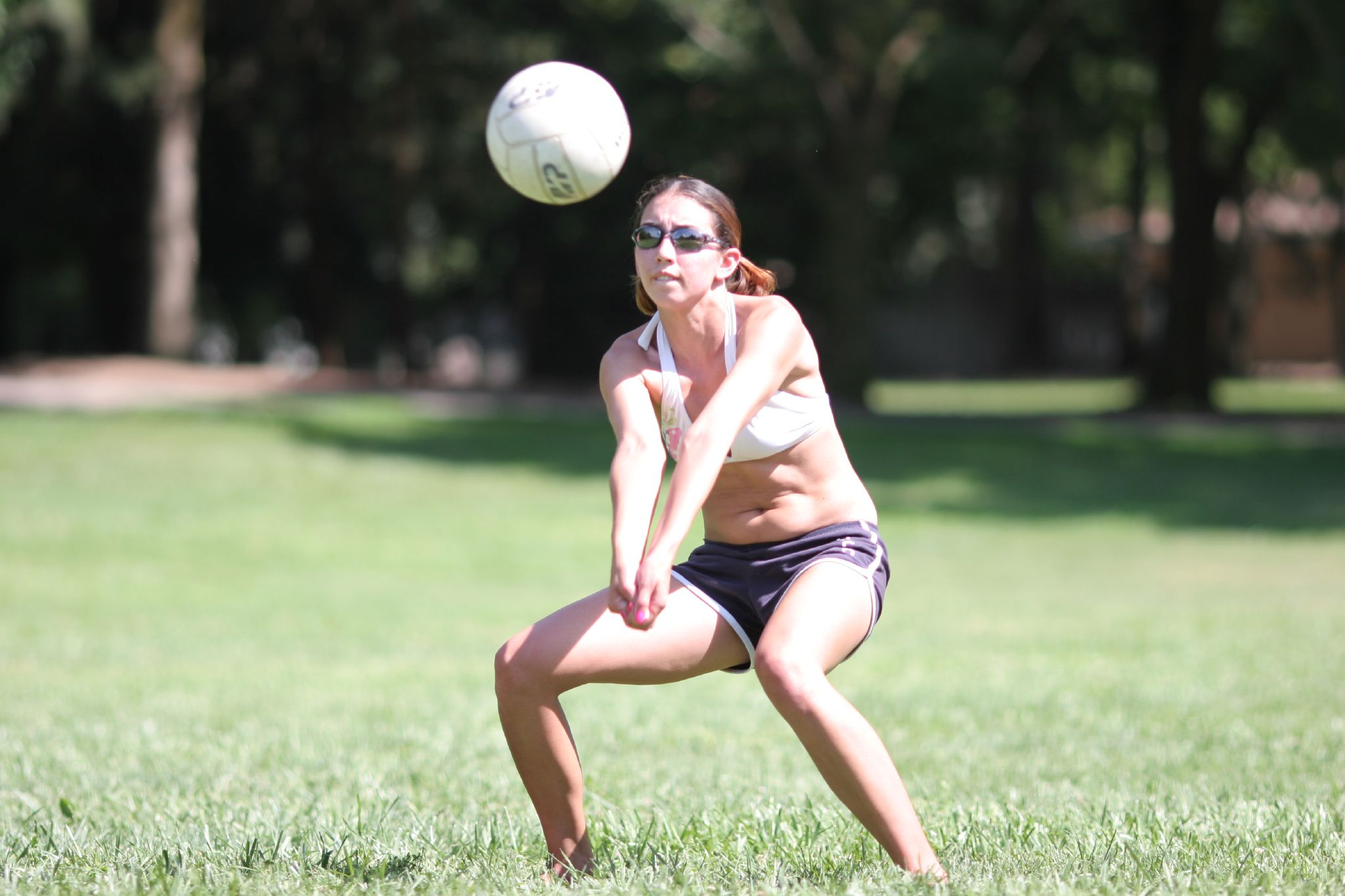
A player making a forearm pass or bump

Also called reception, the pass is the attempt by a team to properly handle the opponent's serve or any form of attack. Proper handling includes not only preventing the ball from touching the court but also making it reach the position where the setter is standing quickly and precisely.

The skill of passing involves fundamentally two specific techniques: underarm pass, or bump, where the ball touches the inside part of the joined forearms or platform, at waistline; and overhand pass, where it is handled with the fingertips, like a set, above the head. Either are acceptable in professional and beach volleyball; however, there are much tighter regulations on the overhand pass in beach volleyball. When a player passes a ball to their setter, it is ideal that the ball has relatively little spin to make it easier for the setter.

=== Set ===
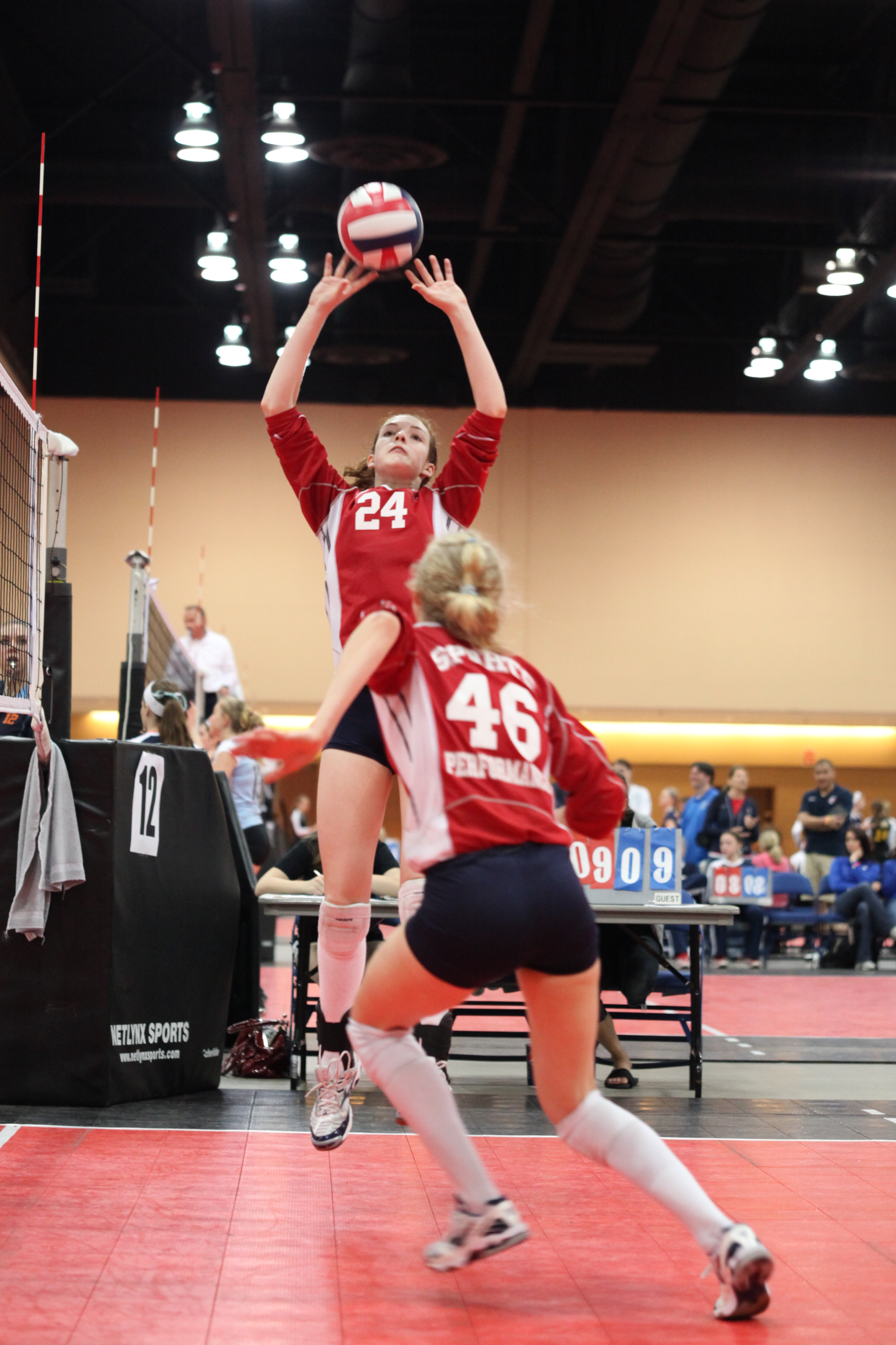
Jump set

The set is usually the second contact that a team makes with the ball. The main goal of setting is to put the ball in the air in such a way that it can be driven by an attack into the opponent's court. The setter coordinates the offensive movements of a team, and is the player who ultimately decides which player will attack the ball.

As with passing, one can distinguish between an overhand set and a bump set. Since the former allows for more control over the speed and direction of the ball, the bump is used only when the ball is too low to be properly handled with the fingertips or in beach volleyball, where rules regulating overhand setting are more stringent. In the case of a set, one also refers to a front set or back set, indicating whether the ball is passed in the direction the setter is facing or behind them. There is also a jump set, used when the ball is too close to the net. In this case, the setter usually jumps off their right foot straight up to avoid going into the net. The setter typically stands about two-thirds of the way from the left to the right side of the net and faces left (the larger portion of the net visible to the setter).

Sometimes a setter refrains from raising the ball for a teammate to perform an attack and tries to play it directly onto the opponent's court. This movement is called a "dump". This can only be performed when the setter is in the front row, otherwise it constitutes an illegal back court attack. The most common dumps are to 'throw' the ball behind the setter or in front of the setter to zones 2 and 4. More experienced setters toss the ball into the deep corners or spike the ball on the second hit.

As with a set or an overhand pass, the setter/passer must be careful to touch the ball with both hands at the same time. If one hand is noticeably late to touch the ball this could result in a less effective set, as well as the referee calling a 'double hit' and giving the point to the opposing team.

=== Attack ===
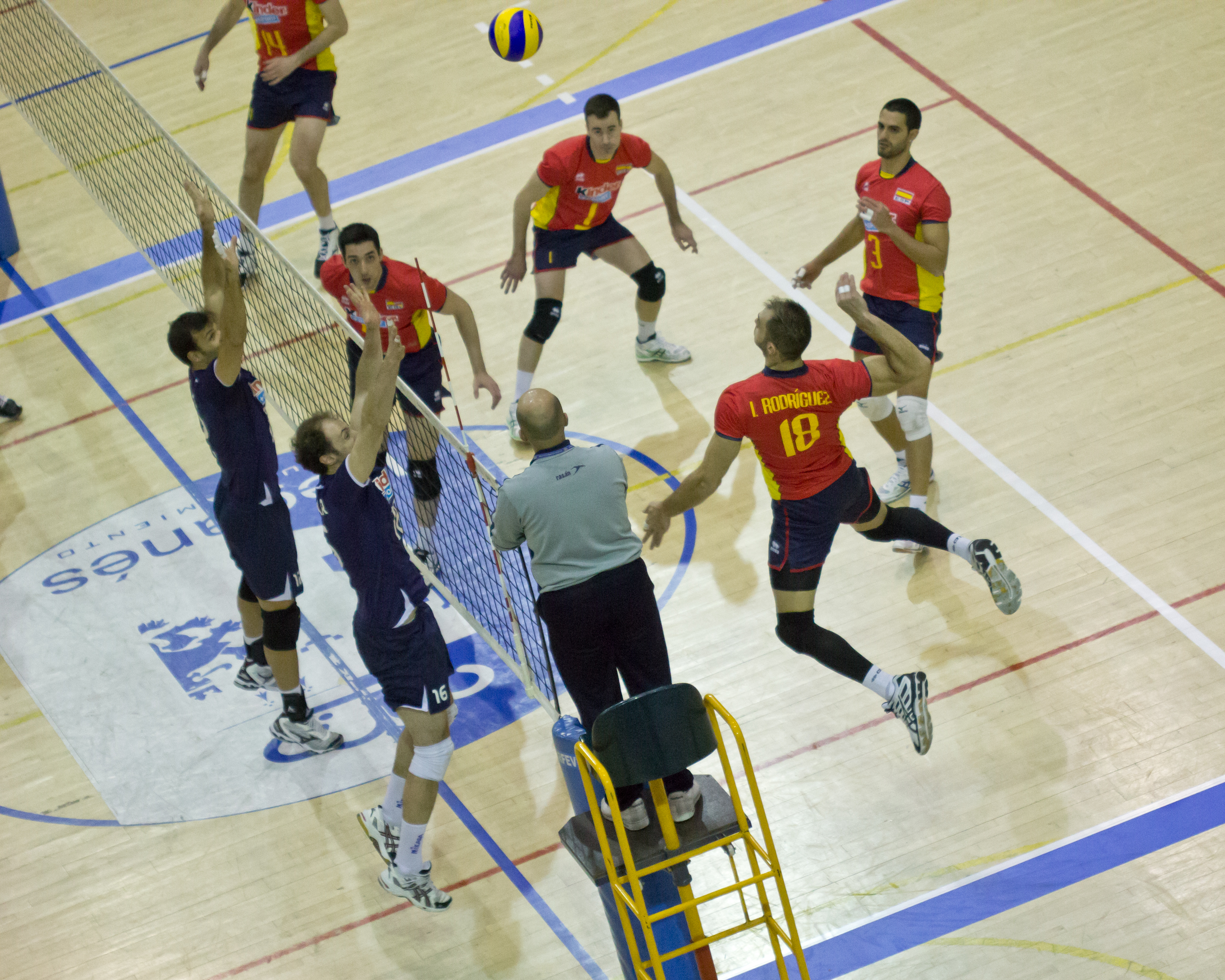
A Spanish player, #18 in a red outfit is shown about to spike towards the Portuguese field, whose players are performing a block

The attack, also known as the spike, is usually the third contact a team makes with the ball. The object of attacking is to handle the ball so that it lands on the opponent's court and cannot be defended. A player makes a series of steps (the "approach"), jumps, and swings at the ball.

Ideally, the contact with the ball is made at the apex of the hitter's jump. At the moment of contact, the hitter's arm is fully extended above their head and slightly forward, making the highest possible contact while maintaining the ability to deliver a powerful hit. The hitter uses arm swing, wrist snap, and a rapid forward contraction of the entire body to drive the ball. A 'bounce' is a slang term for a very hard/loud spike that follows an almost straight trajectory steeply downward into the opponent's court and bounces very high into the air. A "kill" is the slang term for an attack that is not returned by the other team thus resulting in a point.

Contemporary volleyball comprises a number of attacking techniques:

- Backcourt (or back row): an attack performed by a back-row player. The player must jump from behind the 3-meter line before making contact with the ball, but may land in front of the 3-meter line. A Pipe Attack is when the center player in the back row attacks the ball.
- Line and Cross-court Shot: refers to whether the ball flies in a straight trajectory parallel to the sidelines, or crosses through the court in an angle. A cross-court shot with a very pronounced angle, resulting in the ball landing near the 3-meter line, is called a cut shot.
- Dip/Dink/Tip/Cheat/Dump: the player does not try to make a hit, but touches the ball lightly, so that it lands on an area of the opponent's court that is not being covered by the defence.
- Tool/Wipe/Block-abuse: the player does not try to make a hard spike, but hits the ball so that it touches the opponent's block and then bounces off-court.
- Off-speed hit: the player does not hit the ball hard, reducing its speed and thus confusing the opponent's defence.
- Quick hit/"One": an attack (usually by the middle blocker) where the approach and jump begin before the setter contacts the ball. The set (called a "quick set") is placed only slightly above the net and the ball is struck by the hitter almost immediately after leaving the setter's hands. Quick attacks are often effective because they isolate the middle blocker to be the only blocker on the hit.
- Slide: a variation of the quick hit that uses a low backset. The middle hitter steps around the setter and hits from behind him or her.
- Double quick hit/"Stack"/"Tandem": a variation of quick hit where two hitters, one in front and one behind the setter or both in front of the setter, jump to perform a quick hit at the same time. It can be used to deceive opposite blockers and free a fourth hitter attacking from back-court, maybe without block at all.

=== Block ===
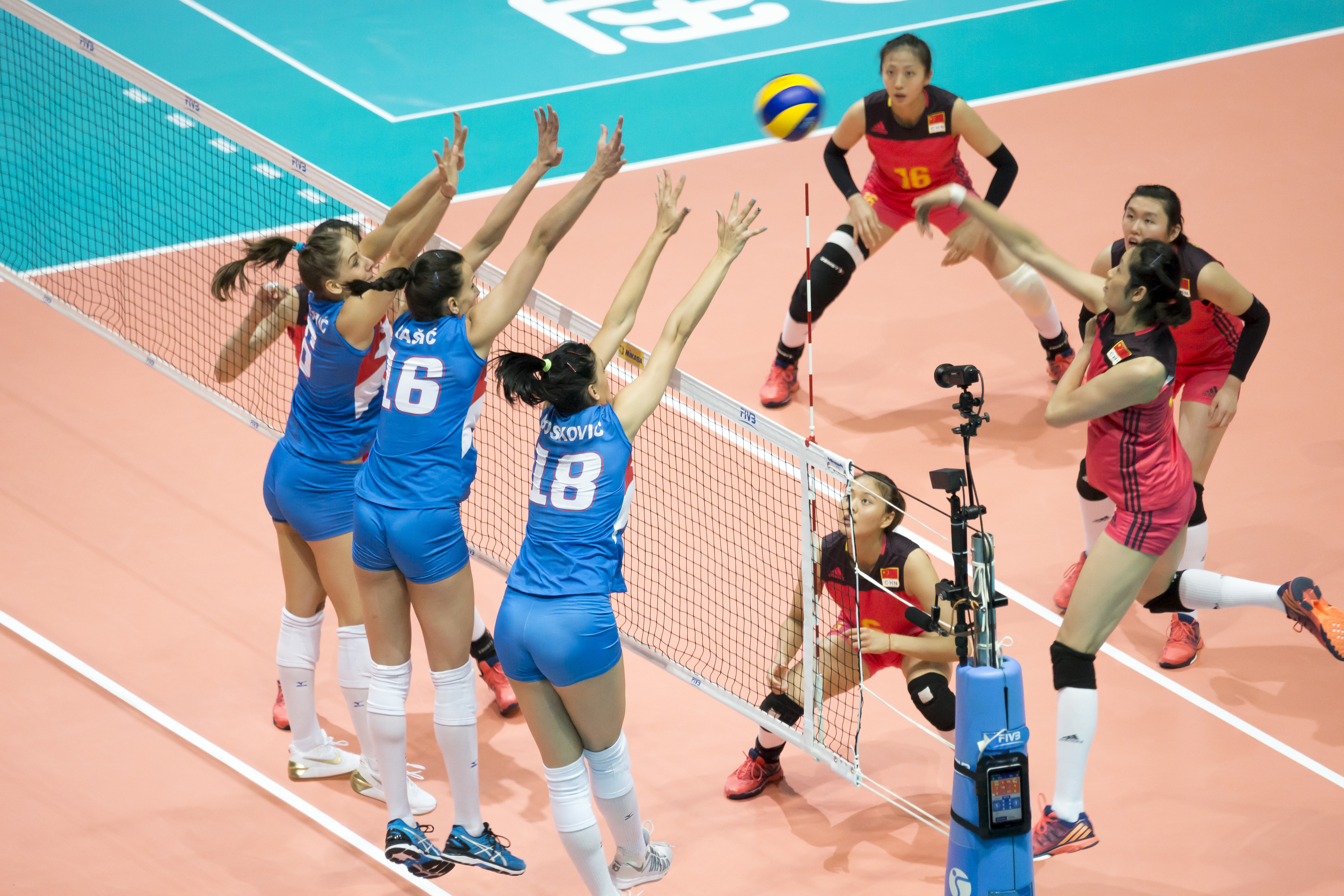
Three players performing a block, also known as a triple block

Blocking refers to the actions taken by players standing at the net to stop or alter an opponent's attack. A block which is aimed at completely stopping an attack, thus making the ball remain in the opponent's court, is called an offensive block. A well-executed offensive block is performed by jumping and reaching to penetrate with one's arms and hands over the net and into the opponent's area. It requires anticipating the direction the ball will go once the attack takes place. It may also require calculating the best footwork to executing the "perfect" block.

The jump should be timed so as to intercept the ball's trajectory prior to it crossing over the plane of the net. Palms are held deflected downward roughly 45–60 degrees toward the interior of the opponents' court. A "roof" is a spectacular offensive block that redirects the power and speed of the attack straight down to the attacker's floor as if the attacker hit the ball into the underside of a peaked house roof. By contrast, it is called a defensive, or "soft" block if the goal is to control and deflect the hard-driven ball up so that it slows down and becomes easier to defend. A well-executed soft-block is performed by jumping and placing one's hands above the net with no penetration into the opponent's court and with the palms up and fingers pointing backwards.

Blocking is also classified according to the number of players involved. Thus, there are single (or solo), double, and triple blocks.

Successful blocking does not always result in a "roof" and many times does not even touch the ball. While it is obvious that a block was a success when the attacker is roofed, a block that consistently forces the attacker away from their 'power' or preferred attack into a more easily controlled shot by the defence is also a highly successful block. At the same time, the block position influences the positions where other defenders place themselves while opponent hitters are spiking.

=== Dig ===
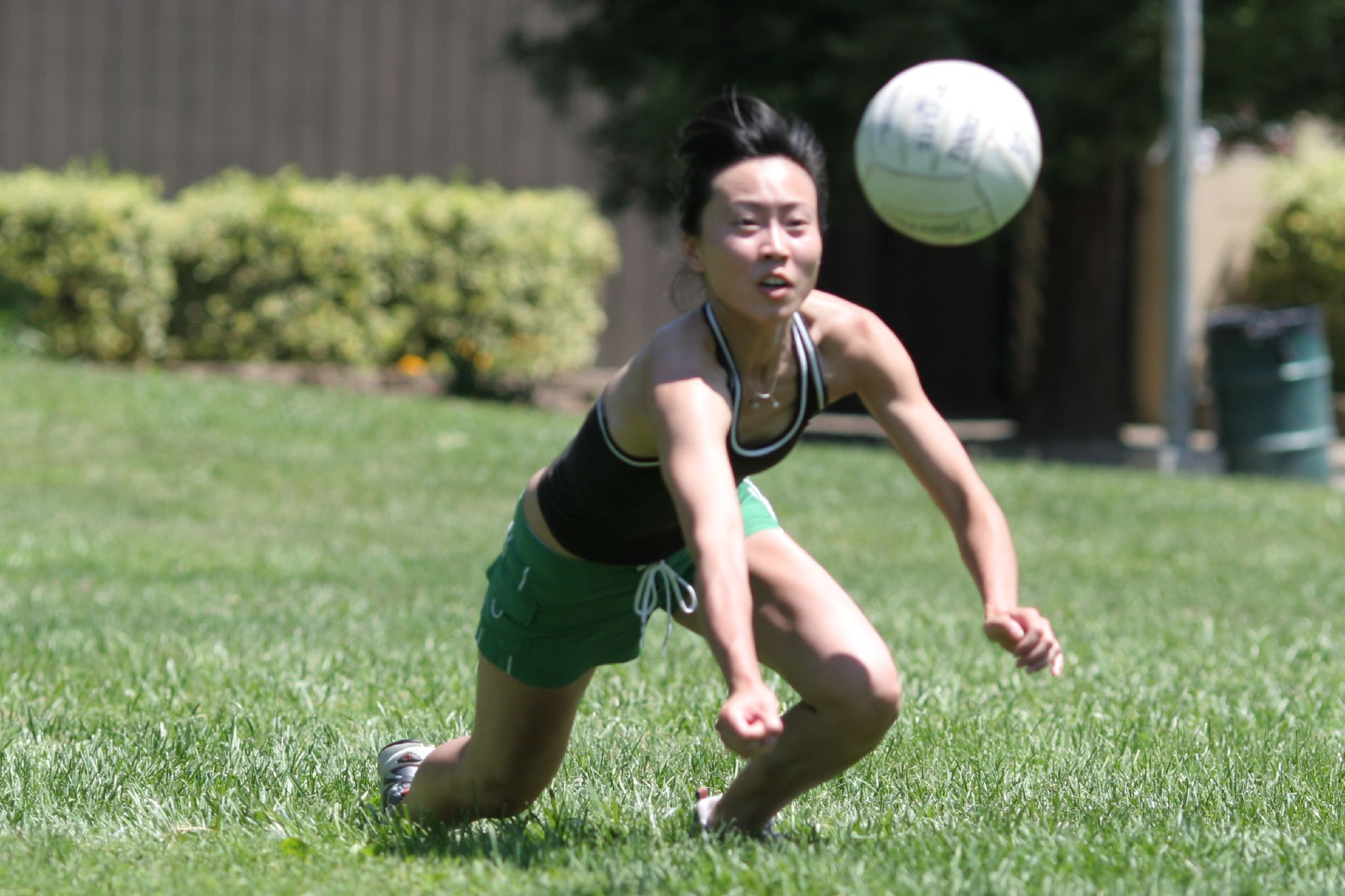
A volleyball player preparing for a dig

Digging is the ability to prevent the ball from touching one's court after a spike or attack, particularly a ball that is nearly touching the ground. In many aspects, this skill is similar to passing, or bumping: overhand dig and bump are also used to distinguish between defensive actions taken with fingertips or with joined arms. It varies from passing, however, in that it is a much more reflex-based skill, especially at the higher levels. It is especially important while digging for players to stay on their toes; several players choose to employ a split step to make sure they are ready to move in any direction.

Some specific techniques are more common in digging than in passing. A player may sometimes perform a "dive", i.e., throw their body in the air with a forward movement in an attempt to save the ball, and land on their chest. When the player also slides their hand under a ball which is almost touching the court it is called a "pancake". The pancake is frequently used in indoor volleyball, but rarely if ever in beach volleyball because the uneven and yielding nature of the sand court limits the chances that the ball will make good, clean contact with the hand. When used correctly, it is one of the more spectacular defensive volleyball plays.

Sometimes a player may also be forced to drop their body quickly to the floor to save the ball. In this situation, the player makes use of a specific rolling technique to minimize the chances of injuries.

== Team play ==
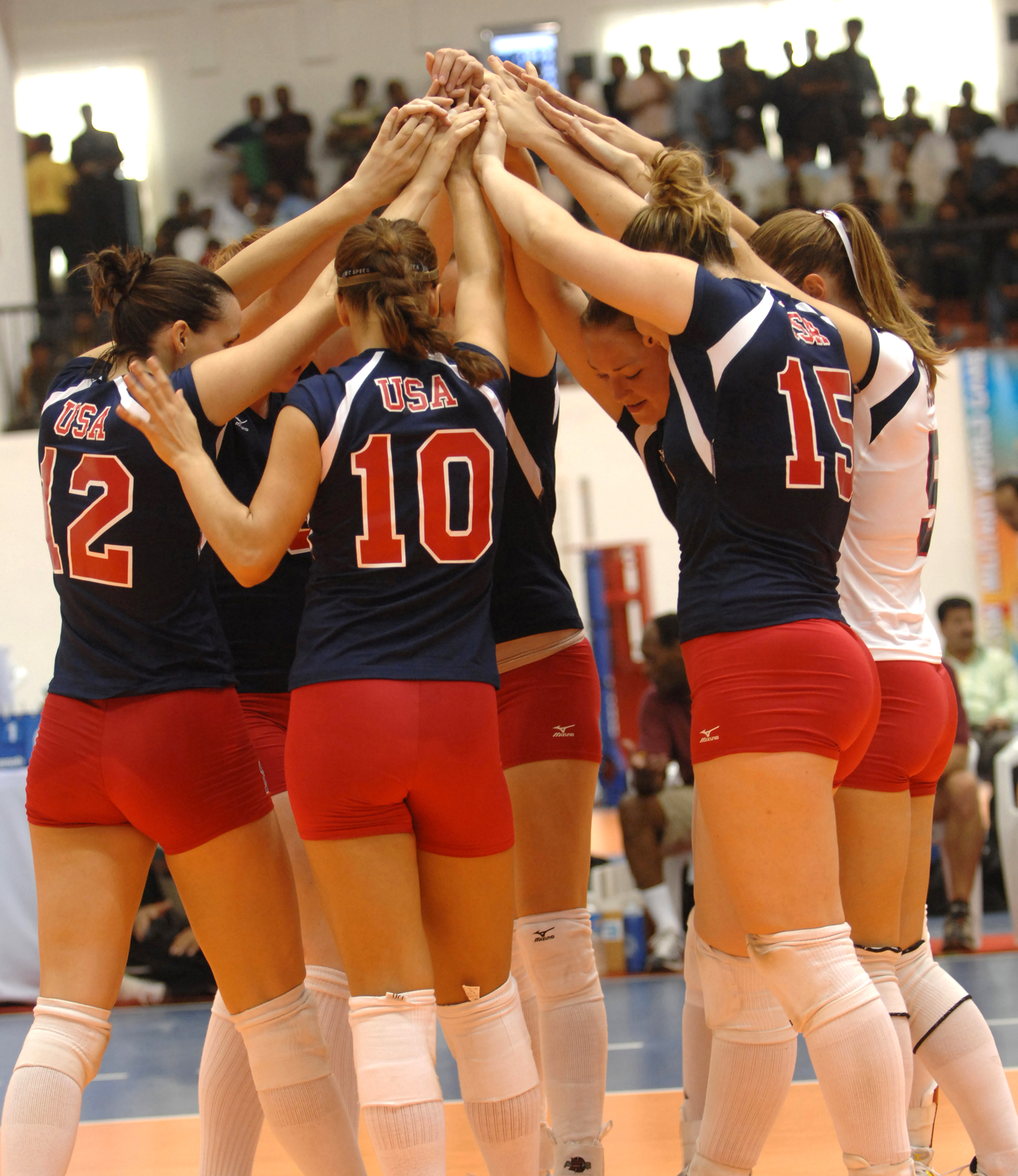
The U.S. women's team huddling at the 2007 Military World Games

Volleyball is essentially a game of transition from one of the above skills to the next, with choreographed team movement between plays on the ball. The team's movements are determined by the teams chosen serve receive system, offensive system, coverage system, and defensive system.

The serve-receive system is the formation used by the receiving team to attempt to pass the ball to the designated setter. Systems can consist of 5 receivers, 4 receivers, 3 receivers, and in some cases 2 receivers. The most popular formation at higher levels is a 3 receiver formation consisting of two left sides and a libero receiving every rotation. This allows middles and right sides to become more specialized at hitting and blocking. Offensive systems are the formations used by the offence to attempt to ground the ball into the opposing court (or otherwise score points). Formations often include designated player positions with skill specialization (see Player specialization, below). Popular formations include the 4–2, 6–2, and 5-1 systems (see Formations, below). There are also several different attacking schemes teams can use to keep the opposing defense off balance.

Coverage systems are the formations used by the offence to protect their court in the case of a blocked attack. Executed by the 5 offensive players not directly attacking the ball, players move to assigned positions around the attacker to dig up any ball that deflects off the block back into their own court. Popular formations include the 2-3 system and the 1-2-2 system. In lieu of a system, some teams just use a random coverage with the players nearest the hitter.

Defensive systems are formations used by the defense to prevent the ball from being grounded in their court by the opposing team. These systems outline which players are responsible for specific areas of the court depending on where the opposing team is attacking from. Popular systems include the 6-Up, 6-Back-Deep, and 6-Back-Slide defenses. Teams can also employ various blocking schemes to disrupt the opposing team's offense. When one player is ready to serve, some teams line up their other five players in a screen to obscure the receiving team's view. This action is only illegal if the server uses the screen, so the call is left to the referee's discretion based on the screen's impact on the receiving team's ability to pass the ball. The most common screening style involves a W formation designed to take up as much horizontal space as possible.

== Strategy ==
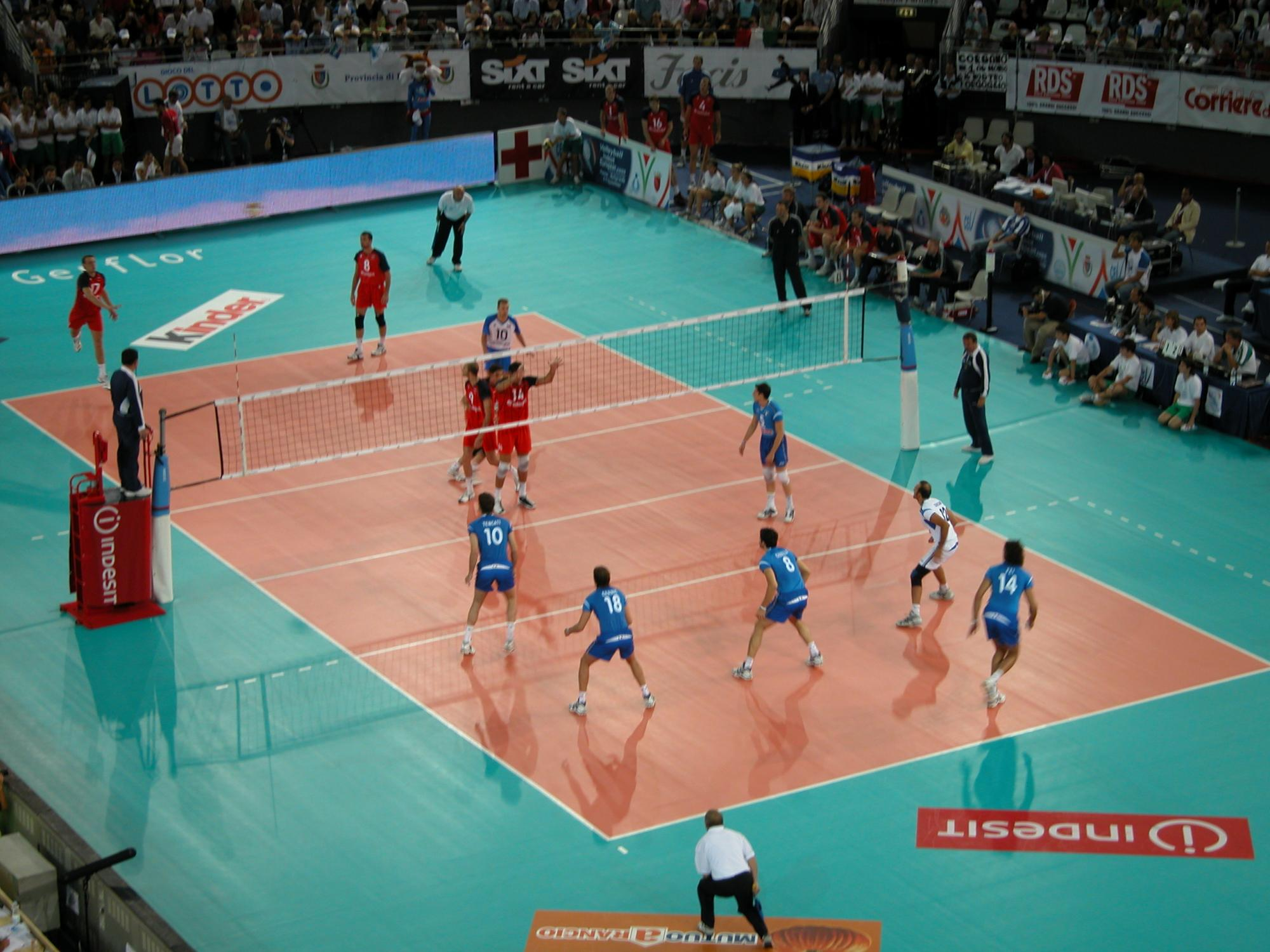
An international match between Italy and Russia in 2005; the Russian player on the left has just served with three men from his team next to the net moving to their assigned block positions from the starting ones. Two others, in the back-row positions, are preparing for defense. Italy, on the right, has three men in a line, each preparing to pass if the ball reaches him. The setter is waiting for his pass while the middle hitter (#10) will jump for a quick hit if the pass is good enough. Alessandro Fei (#14) has no passing duties and is preparing for a back-row hit on the right side of the field.

=== Player specialization ===
There are five positions filled on every volleyball team at the elite level: setter, outside hitter (left-side hitter), middle hitter (middle blocker), opposite hitter (right-side hitter) and libero / defensive specialist. Each of the positions plays a specific, key role in winning a volleyball match.

- Setters have the task for orchestrating the offence of the team. They aim for the second touch and their main responsibility is to place the ball in the air where the attackers can place the ball into the opponents' court for a point. They have to be able to operate with the hitters, manage the tempo of their side of the court and choose the right attackers to set. Setters need to have a swift and skillful appraisal and tactical accuracy and must be quick at moving around the court. At elite level, setters used to usually be the shortest players of a team (before liberos were introduced), not being typically required to perform jump hits, but that would imply need for short-term replacement by taller bench players when critical points required more effective blocks; in the 1990s taller setters (e.g. Fabio Vullo, Peter Blangé) began being deployed, in order to improve blocks.
- Liberos are defensive players who are responsible for receiving the attack or serve. They are usually the players on the court with the quickest reaction time and best passing skills. Libero means 'free' in Italian—they receive this name as they have the ability to substitute for any other player on the court during each play (usually the middle blocker). Liberos are not permitted to block or perform attacks, meaning they never play at the net, which allows shorter players with strong passing and defensive skills to excel in the position and play an important role in the team's success. A player designated as a libero for a match may not play other roles during that match. Liberos wear a different color jersey than their teammates.
- Middle hitters, or middle blockers, are players that can perform very fast attacks that usually take place near the setter. They are specialized in blocking since they must attempt to stop equally fast plays from their opponents and then quickly set up a double block at the sides of the court. In non-beginners play, every team will have two middle hitters. At elite levels, middle hitters are usually the tallest players, whose limited agility is countered by their height enabling more effective blocks.
- Outside hitters, or left-side hitters, attack from near the left antenna. The outside hitter is usually the most consistent hitter on the team and gets the most sets. Inaccurate first passes usually result in a set to the outside hitter rather than middle or opposite. Since most sets to the outside are high, the outside hitter may take a longer approach, always starting from outside the court sideline. In non-beginners play, there are again two outside hitters on every team in every match. At elite level, outside hitters are slightly shorter than middle hitters and opposite hitters, but have the best defensive skills, therefore always re-placing to the middle while in the back row.
- Opposite hitters, or right-side hitters, carry the defensive workload for a volleyball team in the front row. Their primary responsibilities are to put up a well-formed block against the opponents' Outside hitters and serve as a backup setter. Sets to the opposite usually go to the right side of the antennae. Therefore, they are usually the most technical hitters since balls lifted to the right side are quicker and more difficult to handle (the setters having to place the ball while slightly off-set to the right, and with their back to the attacker), and also having to jump from the back row when the setter is on the front row. At elite level, until the 1990s several opposite hitters used to be able to also play as middle hitters (e.g. Andrea Zorzi, Andrea Giani), before high specialization curtailed this flexibility in the role.

At some levels where substitutions are unlimited, teams will make use of a defensive specialist in place of or in addition to a libero. This position does not have unique rules like the libero position; instead, these players are used to substitute out a poor back row defender using regular substitution rules. A defensive specialist is often used if a team has a particularly poor back court defender in their right side or left side, but is already using a libero to take out their middles. Most often, the situation involves a team using a right-side player with a big block who must be subbed out in the back row because they are not able to effectively play backcourt defense. Similarly, a team might use a serving specialist to sub out a poor server.

=== Formations ===
The three standard volleyball formations are known as "4–2", "6–2" and "5–1", which refers to the number of hitters and setters, respectively. 4–2 is a basic formation used only in beginners' play, while 5–1 is by far the most common formation in high-level play.

==== 4–2 ====
The 4–2 formation has four hitters and two setters. The setters usually set from the middle front or right front position. The team will, therefore, have two front-row attackers at all times. In the international 4–2, the setters set from the right front position. The international 4–2 translates more easily into other forms of offence. The setters line up opposite each other in the rotation. The typical lineup has two outside hitters. By aligning like positions opposite themselves in the rotation, there will always be one of each position in the front and back rows. After service, the players in the front row move into their assigned positions, so that the setter is always in the middle front. Alternatively, the setter moves into the right front and has both a middle and an outside attacker; the disadvantage here lies in the lack of an offside hitter, allowing one of the other team's blockers to "cheat in" on a middle block.

The clear disadvantage with this offensive formation is that there are only two attackers, leaving a team with fewer offensive weapons.

Another aspect is to see the setter as an attacking force, albeit a weakened force, because when the setter is in the frontcourt they are able to 'tip' or 'dump', so when the ball is close to the net on the second touch, the setter may opt to hit the ball over with one hand. This means that the blocker who would otherwise not have to block the setter is engaged and may allow one of the hitters to have an easier attack.

==== 6–2 ====
In the 6–2 formation, a player always comes forward from the back row to set. The three front row players are all in attacking positions. As a result, all six players act as hitters at one time or another, while two can act as setters. So the 6–2 formation is now a 4–2 system, but the back-row setter penetrates to set. The 6–2 lineup thus requires two setters, who line up opposite to each other in the rotation. In addition to the setters, a typical lineup will have two middle hitters and two outside hitters. By aligning like positions opposite themselves in the rotation, there will always be one of each position in the front and back rows. After service, the players in the front row move into their assigned positions.

The advantage of the 6–2 is that there are always three front-row hitters available, maximizing the offensive possibilities. However, not only does the 6–2 require a team to possess two people capable of performing the highly specialized role of setter, it also requires both of those players to be effective offensive hitters when not in the setter position. At the international level, only the Cuban National Women's Team employs this kind of formation. It is also used by NCAA teams in Division III men's play and women's play in all divisions, partially due to the variant rules used which allow more substitutions per set than the 6 allowed in the standard rules—12 in matches involving two Division III men's teams and 15 for all women's play.

==== 5–1 ====
The 5–1 formation has only one player who assumes setting responsibilities regardless of their position in the rotation. The team will, therefore, have three front-row attackers when the setter is in the back row and only two when the setter is in the front row, for a total of five possible attackers.

The player opposite the setter in a 5–1 rotation is called the opposite hitter. In general, opposite hitters do not pass; they stand behind their teammates when the opponent is serving. The opposite hitter may be used as a third attack option (back-row attack) when the setter is in the front row: this is the normal option used to increase the attack capabilities of modern volleyball teams. Normally the opposite hitter is the most technically skilled hitter of the team. Back-row attacks generally come from the back-right position, known as zone 1, but are increasingly performed from back-center in high-level play.

The big advantage of the system is that the setter always has 3 hitters with which to vary sets. If the setter performs well, the opponent's middle blocker may not have enough time to block with the outside blocker, increasing the chance for the attacking team to make a point.

There is another advantage, the same as that of a 4–2 formation: as a front-row player the setter is allowed to jump and "dump" the ball onto the opponent's side. Thus the setter can confuse the opponent's blocking players; they have the option to jump and dump or set to one of the hitters. A good setter knows and they are able to jump to dump or to set for a quick hit as well as when setting outside, thus they are able to confuse the opponent.

The 5–1 offence is a mix of 6–2 and 4–2: when the setter is in the front row, the offense looks like a 4–2; when the setter is in the back row, the offense looks like a 6–2.

== Media ==
=== Movies ===
- Side Out (1990): A law student goes to California and ends up playing professional volleyball.
- Air Bud: Spikes Back (2003): A sequel in the Air Bud series that shows the titular golden retriever playing volleyball.
- All You've Got (2006); A TV movie starring hip hop artist Ciara.
- The Miracle Season (2018): A team comes together after the death of their star player in hopes of winning the state championship.

=== Television ===
- Attack No. 1 (1969)
- Attacker You! (1984): A Japanese anime about a junior high schoolgirl playing volleyball after moving to Tokyo from the countryside.
- Haikyu!! (2014): A Japanese anime about a high school boys volleyball team striving to be the best in Japan.
- Harukana Receive (2018): A Japanese anime about teen girls playing beach volleyball and having a match with other girls.
- 2.43: Seiin High School Boys Volleyball Team (2021): A Japanese anime about a high school boys volleyball team's journey to victory.

== Variations and related games ==
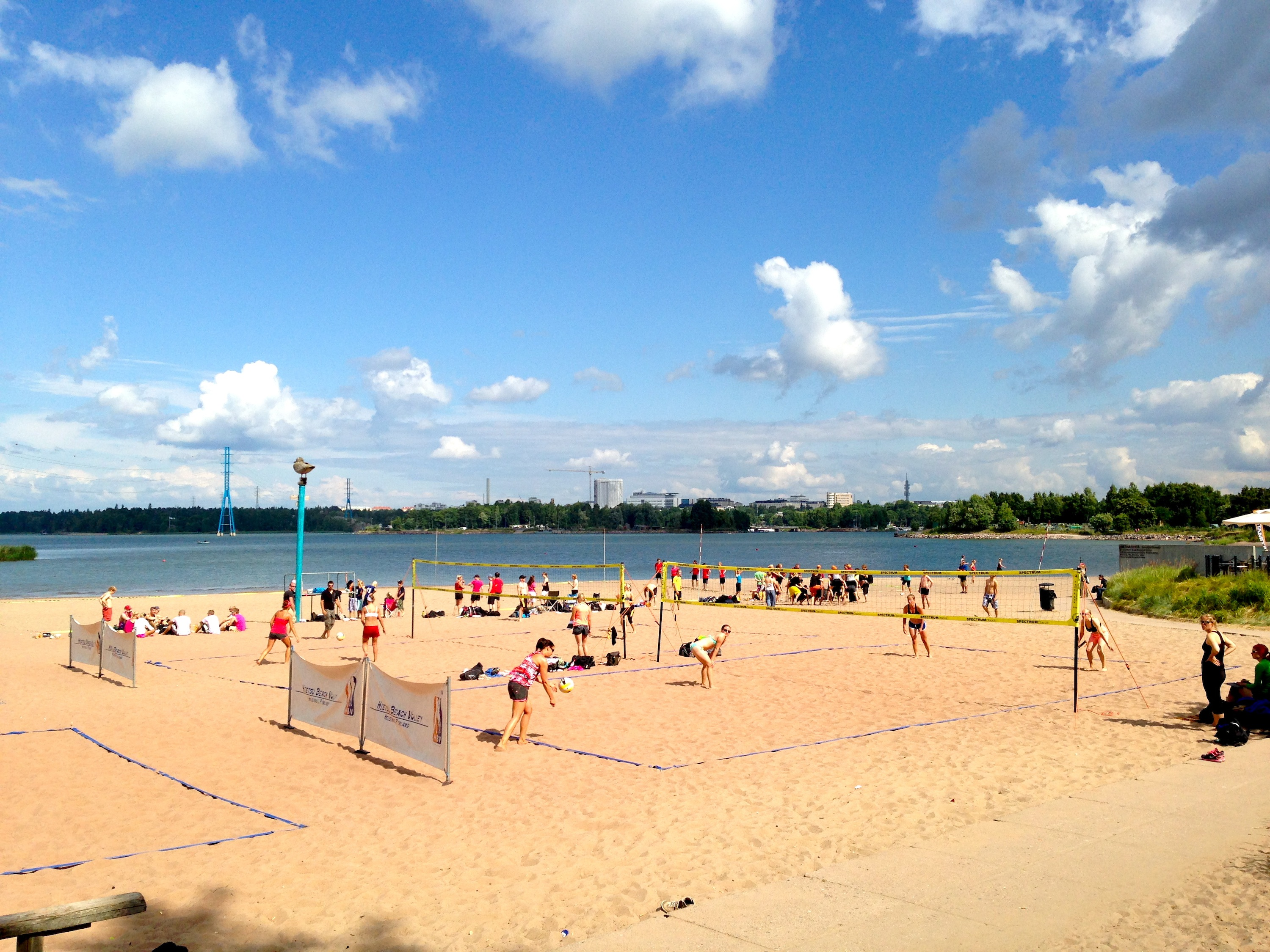
Beach volleyball at the Hietaniemi Beach in Helsinki, Finland

There are many variations on the basic rules of volleyball. By far the most popular of these is beach volleyball, which is played on sand with two people per team and rivals the main sport in popularity.

Some games related to volleyball include:

- Crossnet: a four-way volleyball game, combining volleyball and foursquare.
- 9-man: A variant invented by Chinese immigrants to the United States in the 1930s. 9-man is still played in Asian countries and North America, being recognized for its historic and cultural significance. In 2014, a documentary was produced about the sport.
- Beachball volleyball: A game of indoor volleyball played with a beach ball instead of a volleyball.
- Biribol: an aquatic variant, played in shallow swimming pools. The name comes from the Brazilian city where it was invented, Birigui. It is similar to water volleyball.
- Ecua-volley: A variant invented in Ecuador, with some significant variants, such as number of players, and a heavier ball.
- Footvolley: A sport from Brazil in which the hands and arms are not used, but it is otherwise similar to beach volleyball.
- Hooverball: Popularized by President Herbert Hoover, it is played with a volleyball net and a medicine ball; it is scored like tennis, but the ball is caught and then thrown back. The weight of the medicine ball can make the sport physically demanding for players; annual championship tournaments are held in West Branch, Iowa.
- Newcomb ball (sometimes spelled "Nuke 'Em"): In this game, the ball is caught and thrown instead of hit; it rivaled volleyball in popularity until the 1920s.
  - Prisoner Ball: Also played with volleyball court and a volleyball, prisoner ball is a variation of Newcomb ball where players are "taken prisoner" or released from "prison" instead of scoring points. This version is usually played by young children.
- Sepak Takraw: Played in Southeast Asia using a rattan ball and allowing only players' feet, knees, chests, and heads to touch the ball.
- Snow volleyball: a variant of beach volleyball that is played on snow. The Fédération Internationale de Volleyball has announced its plans to make snow volleyball part of the future Winter Olympic Games programme.
- Throwball: became popular with female players at the YMCA College of Physical Education in Chennai (India) in the 1940s.
- Towel volleyball: towel volleyball is a popular form of outdoor entertainment. The game takes place in a volleyball court, and players work in pairs, holding towels in their hands and attempting to throw the ball into the opponent's field. This version can also be played with blankets held by four people. There are several variations.
- Volley squash, a form of volleyball played within a squash court or similar sized enclosed space.
- Wallyball: A variation of volleyball played in a racquetball court with a rubber ball.

== See also ==
- Lists of volleyball players – lists of notable players, and fictional players
- List of volleyball video games
- Volleyball Hall of Fame
- Volleyball jargon
- Volleyball injuries
