= Volleyball injuries =

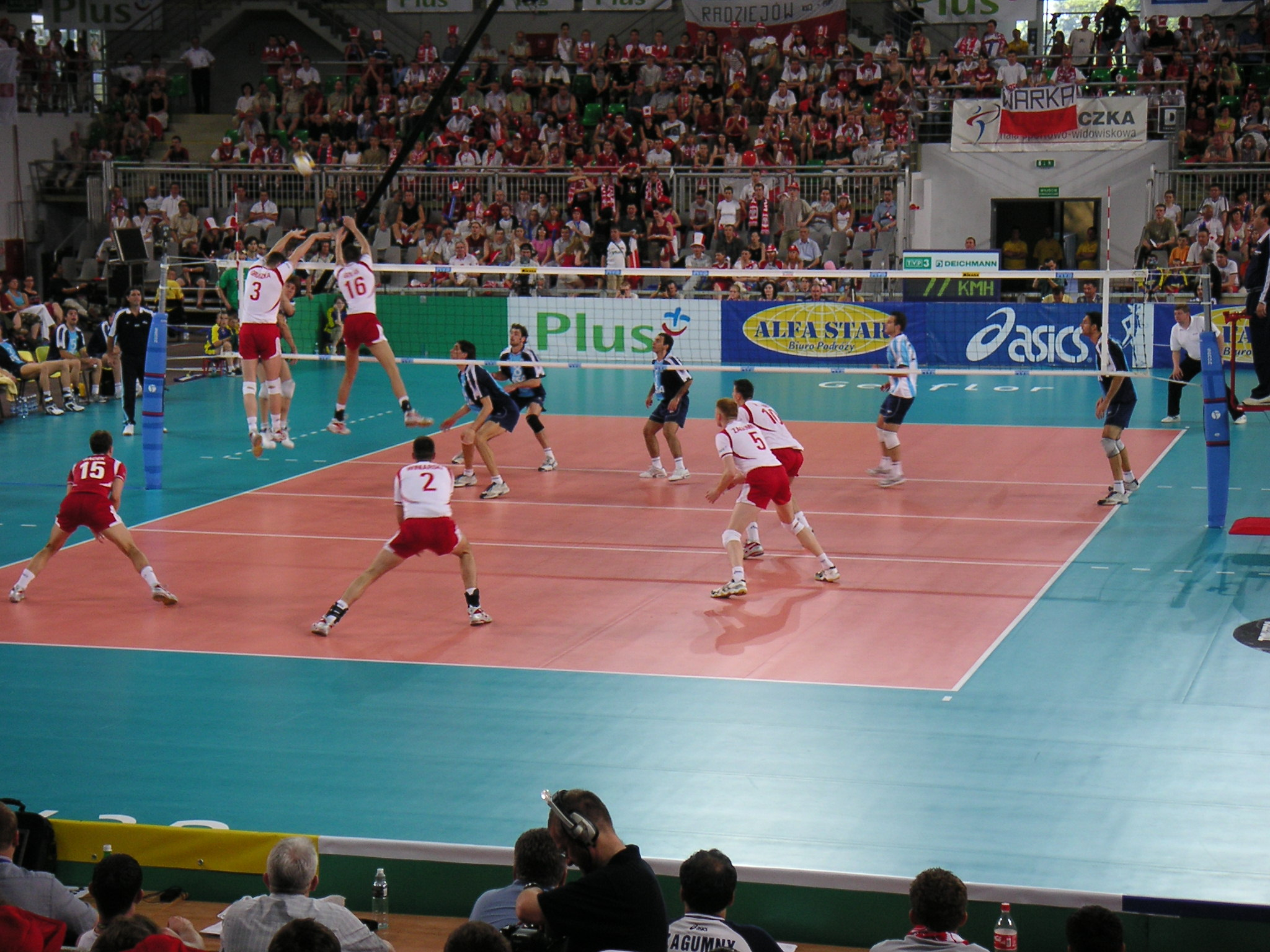
A volleyball match between Poland and Argentina

Volleyball is a game played between two opposing sides, with six players on each team, where the players use mainly their hands to hit the ball over a net and try to make the ball land on the opposing team's side of the court. Volleyball is played by over 800 million people worldwide, making it one of the most popular sports in the world. Volleyball has some risks involved with it because there are some injuries which occur to players that are quite common; these include ankle injuries, shoulder injuries, foot injuries and knee injuries.

== Ankle sprains ==
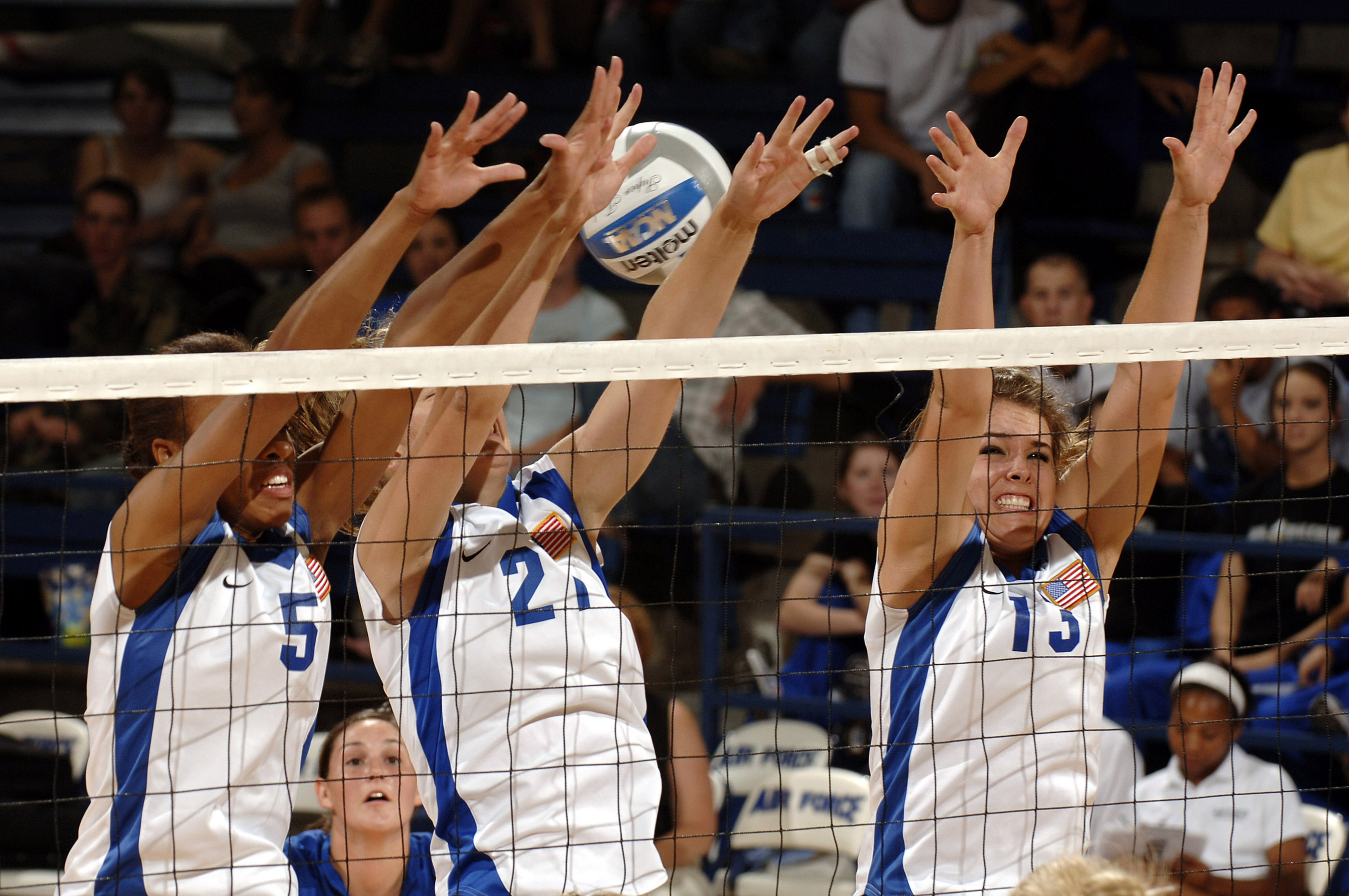
Three teammates who are attempting to block a ball have a greater risk of landing on each other's feet and spraining their ankle.

The majority of sprained ankles in volleyball occur when a player is at the net, either blocking or spiking. The reason why ankle sprains occur at the net is because both blocking and spiking involve jumping and possibly of landing on an opponent's foot causing the injury. Approximately 50 percent of all sprained ankles in volleyball occur when a blocker lands on the attacking player's foot, while about 25 percent occur when a blocker lands on their own teammate's foot following a block with multiple blockers involved.

One possible situation that can cause a player to sprain their ankle is when the ball is set too tight or close to the net. As the ball is too close to the net the player who is attempting to spike the ball has to jump closer to the net meaning that they have a higher possibility of landing on or over the center line on the court. By doing this both the blockers and attacker are at an increased risk of spraining their ankle. There are some simple ways in which ankle sprains can be prevented, which include rule changes, technical training and strapping or bracing the ankle.

== Shoulder injuries ==
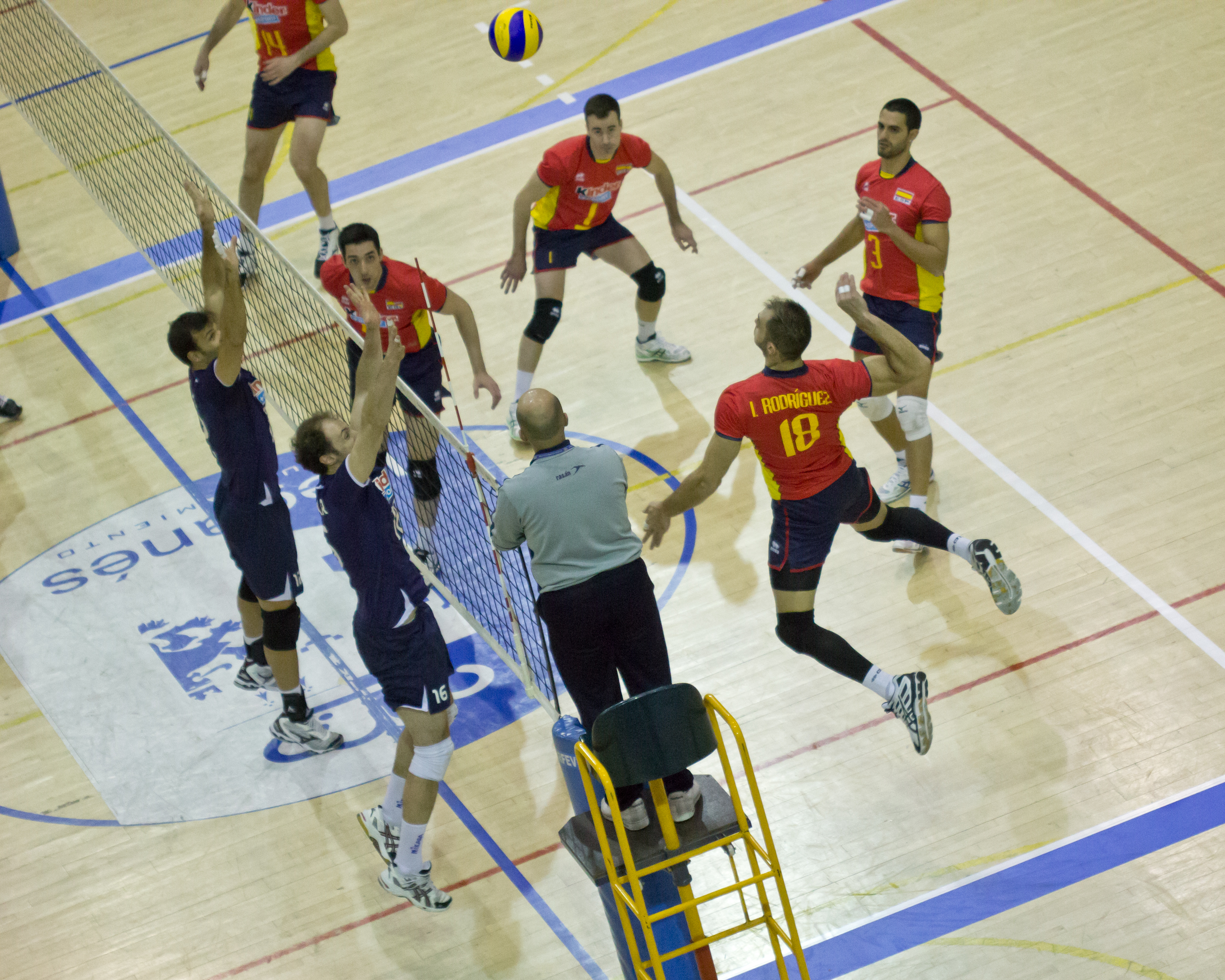
Spiking in volleyball places the shoulder under stress and can result in injury to the shoulder.

There is currently a high number of shoulder injuries in volleyball, and it is still unknown how this number can be managed. Shoulder injuries are great in number because the shoulder is constantly placed under stress during the spiking movements. The stress is caused by the rotation of the arm around the shoulder joint at a high velocity. There are however multiple spiking techniques, including traditional and alternative techniques, that have different risks to the shoulder. The alternative spiking method is said to be a possible prevention to some injuries that occur in the shoulder and also enhance an athlete's performance.

== Jumper's knee ==
Jumper's knee is injury term used in volleyball circles that describes the injury known as patella tendinopathy, patella tendinosis or patella tendonitis. Jumper's knee is defined as a syndrome of tendon pain, localized tenderness and that is detrimental to an athlete's performance. In the initial phase of the injury the tendons with the knee are usually inflamed. If jumper's knee becomes a chronic injury, which usually occurs as age increases, the tendons show an increasing degree of degeneration and little to no inflation present. As the etiology and pathology of jumper's knee is not known the treatment varies and is largely based on a trial and error basis.

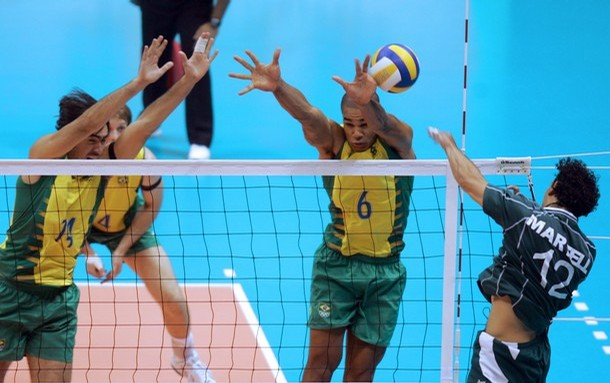
Both blocking and spiking involve jumping and have the possibility to cause jumper's knee.

Jumper's knee is said to occur after frequent actions involving quick accelerations and decelerations, eccentric activities and quick cutting actions. As spiking involves jumping, in which a quick acceleration occurs when jumping and quick deceleration when landing, this action is a possible cause of jumper's knee. Also blocking is a possible cause of jumper's knee because it to involves jumping and landing quickly. However, jumper's knee is less common among athletes who compete in beach volleyball rather than those who play indoor volleyball. This is because beach volleyball is played on sand which reduces the impact of landing on the knee.

== Preventative measures, treatment, and other common injuries ==
There are ways to prevent injuries such as stretching, proper hydration, conditioning, and more. Also, knee pads are necessary to help avoid knee injuries and ankle braces are often used as a way to stabilize the ankles when jumping. The most common volleyball associated injuries are found in the ankles, fingers, shoulders, knees, and the back. These include rotator cuff tendonitis, ACL tear, patellar tendonitis, ligament tears or dislocation in fingers, ankle sprains, and low back pain associated with stress or a herniated disk. Treatment for these injuries includes physical therapy, strength training, and occasionally surgery or a brace. If surgery is needed, the time to return to play may vary depending on the severity of the injury. For a torn ACL, recovery to return is anywhere from 6 to 9 months. Often volleyball injuries are due to poor form when blocking and receiving a serve or a hit. Certainly, there are times where the injuries cannot be prevented and are simply accidental. To avoid injuries, conditioning and stretching are very important as well as correctly executing each play.

== See also ==
- Volleyball
