= Water volleyball =

Ball sport

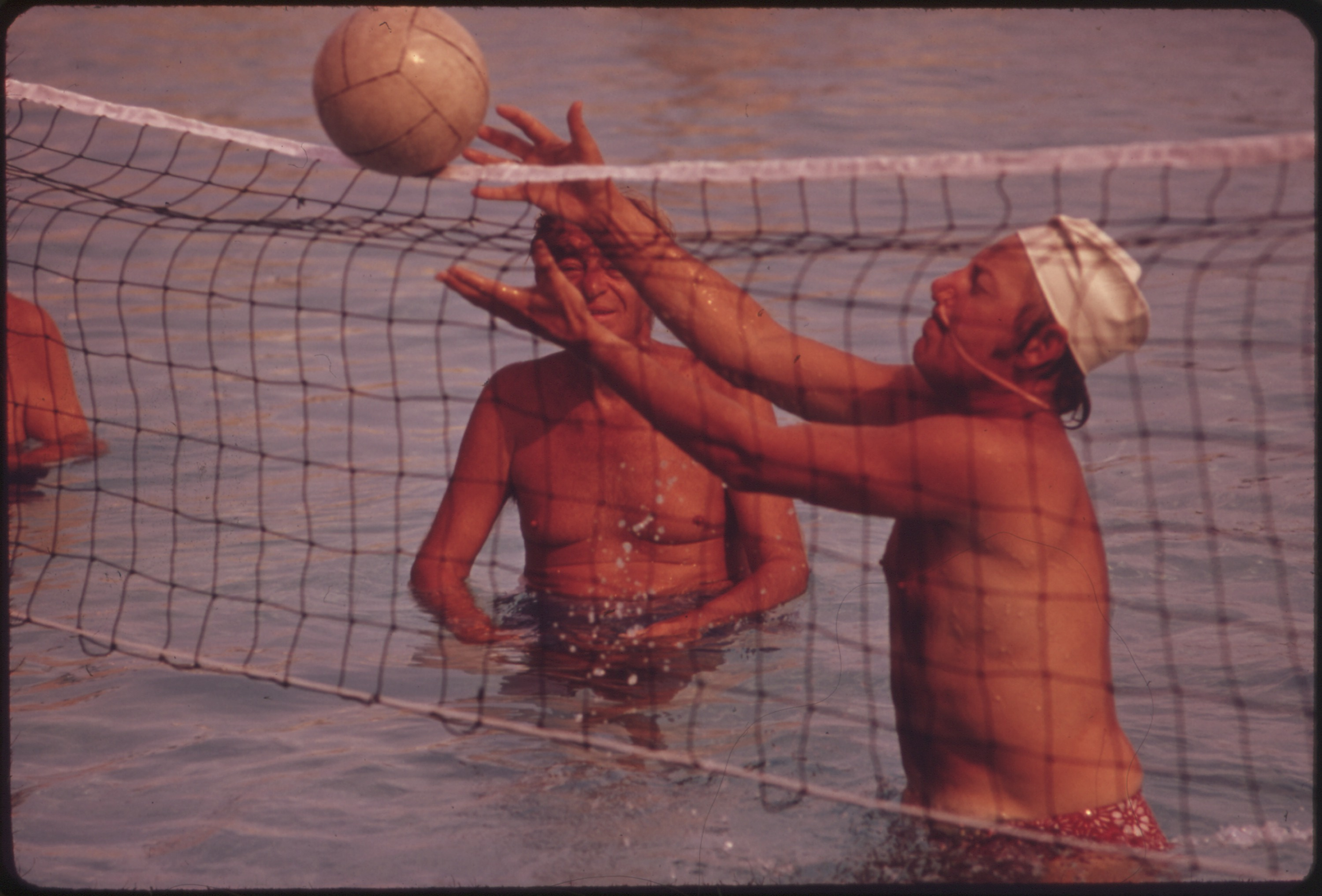

Water volleyball (also called pool and acqua volleyball) is a competitive middle-court oriented water game. It can be played between two teams, each team consisting of 1 to 4 players, depending on the area of water in which the game is being played.

== History ==
Water volleyball has emerged from recreational pool activities, sports, aquatic clubs, water parks, through the practice of unification of the beach and water tournaments. In the 1990s, Disney water parks had pool volleyball entertainment. DLRG- Ortsgruppe Havixbeck, has organized first water volley tournament in 1985, creating by-so water volleyball club. US has on its own developed powerful swimming pool play, creating volley standards. Water Volleyball is played throughout US Universities, such as: University of San Diego, California, Iowa State University, Iowa, University of South Florida, St. Petersburg, Lenoir-Rhyne University, N. C., Lindsey Wilson College.

== Aqua-volei ==
The sport is known differently as Biribol (Brazil), voleibol acuático (Spain), Wasser-Volleyball (Germany), acqua pallavolo (Italy), vodní volejbal (Czech), splash/ pool/water volley (United States).

== Rules ==
=== The court ===
The court must be a rectangle a minimum 3 meters in length to a maximum of 6 meters in length. It can be a minimum of 2 meters in width to a maximum of 5 meters in width. The net must run across the width of the court and be centered along the length so that both players have an equal amount of court in which to play. In most pools there is a deep end and a shallow end. If possible try putting the net where both players are in the deep end.

=== Serving ===
The server must hit the ball upwards, towards the receiver and it must be within arms length of the receiver when standing still. The serve is not allowed to be a spike and the receiver can not spike of the serve. One team serves for 2 points then the other team serves, and play continues in this fashion. When it is 10 apiece, you start serving 1 serve each. A flip of a coin at the start of the game is used to see who serves first, or else the person in the deep end serves first.

=== Game play ===
Water volleyball is played between two teams, usually consisting of 1 to 4 players.

One team is chosen to serve first, whereupon they serve twice, then the team which did not serve first serves twice, and play continues in this fashion. The winner is first team to score eleven points. However, if the score gets to 10 apiece, then the team to score either two points ahead of the other team, or else first to fifteen points, wins the game. There are usually 5 games in a match.

=== Scoring ===
The first team to reach 11 points wins. If the score reaches 10 apiece, then it is first team to by 2 points or first to 15 points.

== See also ==
- Biribol
- Water aerobics
- Water Polo
- Canoe Polo
