= Biribol =

Ball sport

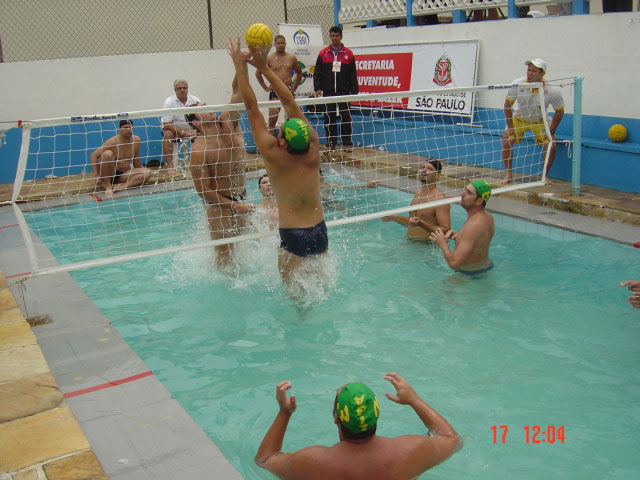

Biribol is a sport, which resembles an aquatic variation of volleyball. It was invented in the 1960s by Prof. Dario Miguel and originated in Brazil, in the city of Birigüi, after which the sport was named. It gained popularity as a group game and an alternative to the practice and the learning of swimming.

== Field ==
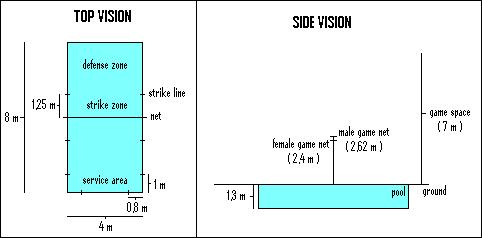
Biribol field

Its game is played inside a pool which size is 8m length, 4m width and 1.30m depth (the depth must be this for the entire pool) with a net in the middle of the pool with 2.62m high for the male and with 2.40m high for the female practice. The game space is constituted by 7m high measured from the surface of the water. There is also an attack area, delimited by a line which cross the pool by 1.25m from where the net is in each side. There are lines that delimit the service area, by the end of the pool, 1m from its length limit and other 0.8m from its width limit.

== Rules ==
=== Game ball ===
The ball is specially crafted ball similar to that of water polo but with a smaller diameter. The ball weights approximately 100 grams more than the volleyball one and employs a "super grip" surface technology. The official game is played with four players on each side, but there is also the doubles modality, with two players on each side. Biribol is a highly recommended sport for working all muscle groups with practically no injury risks due to its no contact, low impact on joints nature. Biribol is also suited for all ages and genders, and is recommended for people with minor chronic injuries that feel discomfort or pain while playing other sports.

=== Game play ===
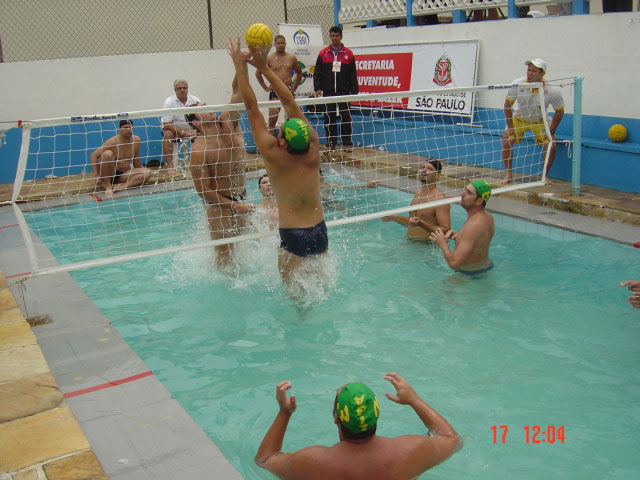
A practice of Biribol in São Paulo

Matches are decided in best-of-three or best-of-five sets of 21 points, when the matches go up to the last set this set is disputed up to the 20th point instead, and a team needs at least two points of advantage in any circumstance to win a set. So if a 21-points set is drawn at 20x20, the match is extended to 22 points, and so on.

The ball can be touched with any part of the player's body, with open or closed hands. The pool's inside borders are neutral, meaning the ball is normally in play after touching them, points are scored when the ball hits the water in the opponents' side or the opponent team commits a fault. As in volleyball, each team can contact the ball no more than three times before the ball crosses the net, while consecutive contacts must be made by different players - except for contacts while blocking, which are not counted. Players also cannot touch the net or they commit a fault and a point is awarded to the opponent team. Unique to the sport is that there is no penetration under and over the net - it is even allowed to block a set being executed in the opponents' side -, the possibility of blocking serves and how there is no lifting (carrying) faults during spikes.

With its fast moving accurate ball and 'closed quarters' action, Biribol is a competitive sport and enjoys a greater than water volleyball in southern Brazil. There is currently a Brazilian National League with teams from São Paulo, Minas Gerais, Mato Grosso do Sul, Goias and Paraná. There are many stages held in different cities of the country, and the Brazilian champion is known in the end of the year, after computing all points of the season. The sport has been reckoned officially in São Paulo.
