= Birigui =

- Municipality
- Municipality of Birigui
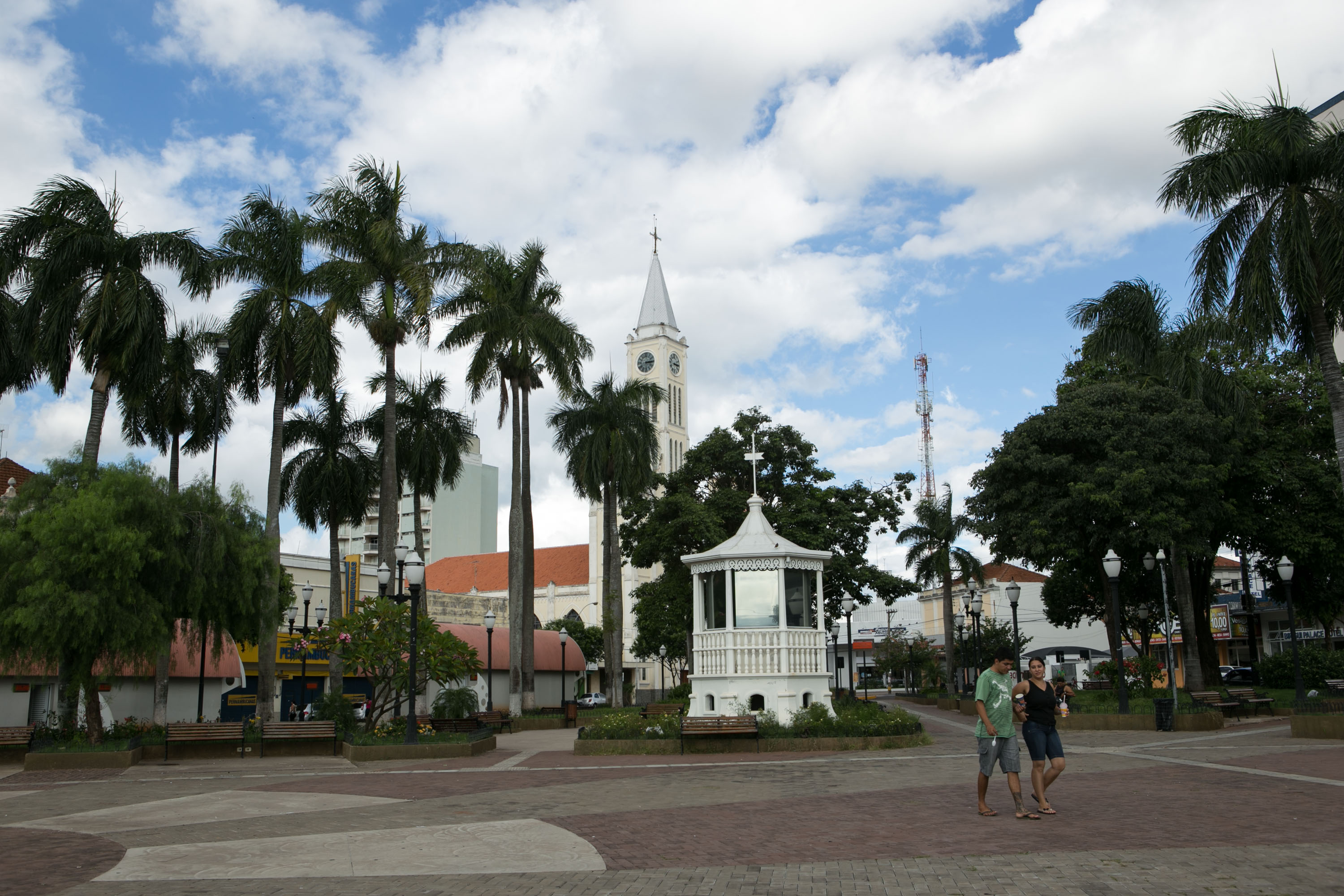
- Dr. Gama square

- Flag Coat of arms
- Nicknames: Capital of children's footwear The Pearl of the Northwest
- Location of Birigui

- Location in Brazil
- Coordinates: 21°17′19″S 50°20′24″W
- Country: Brazil
- Region: Southeast
- State: São Paulo
- Established: 2009

Area
  - Total: 530.9 km^{2} (205.0 sq mi)
- Elevation: 406 m (1,332 ft)

Population (2022)
  - Total: 118,979
  - Estimate (2025): 123,340
  - Density: 224/km^{2} (580/sq mi)
- Time zone: UTC-3 (UTC-3)
  - Summer (DST): UTC-2 (UTC-2)
- Postal Code: 16200-000
- Area code: +55 18
- HDI (2010): 0.780 – high
- Website: birigui.sp.gov.br

Birigui is a city in the state of São Paulo, Brazil. The city is located on the northwest of the state and has 124,883 inhabitants (IBGE/2020) and 530.9 km^{2} of area. The name Birigui comes from the Tupi–Guarani language and means "little fly". It refers to the Lutzomyia fly, very common at the area. The city is known for its children's footwear industry.

== History ==
Birigui came to be settled via its location along the Brazil's Northwest Railway built at the beginning of the 20th century. In 1908, a clearing between kilometers 259 and 261, used as a locomotive waystation, was chosen as the location of a new settlement. The town was founded on December 7, 1911, by Mr. Nicolau da Silva Nunes, a Portuguese entrepreneur native of the Parish of Moutamorta, Trás-os-Montes.

Nicolau da Silva Nunes first learned of the region through a newspaper article. On the first visit, he was charmed by the exuberance and fertility of the lands, and bought 400 alqueires (~968 hectares) for himself and his representatives, Antonio Gonçalves Torres and Afonso Garcia Franco, and when he returned to Sales de Oliveira, the city where he lived, he put the lots up for sale.The founder kept the original name of the location used by the indigenous population, which was also the designation for the way station. The name Birigui comes from the Tupi-Guarani language, meaning "fly that always comes", referring to a tiny hematophagous mosquito endemic to the region.

Birigui received its town charter on December 8, 1921, only ten years after its foundation. In February 1922, the first members of its town hall of were elected, and a month later, Archibald Thomas Clark took office as the first mayor.

== Geography ==
Located under the latitude 21º17'19" S and longitude 50º20'24" W. Geographic space Region: 9th Administrative Region. Location: Northwest of the State of São Paulo. Highways: Marechal Rondon, Engineer Gabriel Melhado Filho and Senator Teotônio Vilela. Boundaries: Northeast - Buritama; East - Crowned; Southwest - Bilac; West - Araçatuba. Distance to:

- São Paulo - 521 km
- Araçatuba - 11 km
- Bilac - 19 km
- Buritama - 40 km
- Coroados - 9 km

=== Weather ===
According to Köppen climate classification Birigui has a humid subtropical climate. Highest 36 °C and Lowest 4 °C.

=== Hydrography ===
Rivers: Tietê, Baixotes, Grande, Tabapuã, Ribeirão Baguaçu, Da Colônia, Do Imbé, Barro Preto, Água Branca

== Demographics ==
Historical population (municipality)
Year	Population	%±
1940	42,912	—
1950	31,018	−27.7%
1960	31,315	1.0%
1970	34,976	11.7%
1980	50,893	45.5%
1991	75,125	47.6%
2000	94,300	25.5%
2010	108,728	15.3%
2022	118,979	9.4%
Sources:

- Population: 108 728 inhabitants (IBGE/2010)
- Demographic density (inhabitants/km^{2}): 204.79
- Infantile mortality until 1 year old(in each thousand children): 9,64
- Life expectancy (years old): 74,96
- Fecundity rate (children by woman): 2,01
- Human development index (HDI): 0,829
  - HDI Income: 0,761
  - HDI Longevity: 0,833
  - HDI Education: 0,893

(Source: IPEADATA)

Ethnography

- Colour/race Percentage
- White 78,0%
- Black 1,8%
- Brown 18,8%
- Yellow 1,1%
- Amerindian 0,2%

== Economy ==
The Tertiary sector corresponds to 71.12% of Birigui's GDP. The Secondary sector is 27.07% of the GDP and the Primary sector corresponds to 1.8%.

Birigui is recognized for being the most important center of children's shoes production in Brazil with a production of 57 million pairs in the year of 2006. In the same year it had 159 industries in the children' shoe's segment and their profit was over 800 million reais (R$). Among all these industries there are over 18 thousand workers which consist in 60% of the jobs offered in all the city.

Footwear industry (2014/2015)

- 350 factories
- Daily output 250,501 pairs
- Annual production 58.2 million pairs / year
- Annual export 2.9%
- Employees in the footwear industry 19,490
- 50 shops of factories (approximately)

== Education ==
The city has 10 day-nurseries, 21 EMEI (Municipal School of Infantile Education), 11 EMEFs (Municipal School of Basic Education), 5 State Schools of Basic Education, 7 State High Schools, 5 private High Schools and 3 universities.

== Media ==
In telecommunications, the city was served by Telecomunicações de São Paulo. In July 1998, this company was acquired by Telefónica, which adopted the Vivo brand in 2012. The company is currently an operator of cell phones, fixed lines, internet (fiber optics/4G) and television (satellite and cable).

== Transportation ==
- SP-300 Rodovia Marechal Cândido Rondon
- SP-461 Rodovia Gabriel Melhado
- Estrada BIGI-458
- Estrada José Gusman

== Sports ==
Soccer and biribol, an aquatic version of volleyball are the most popular sports in the city. The soccer team, Bandeirante Esporte Clube, was founded on March 11, 1923, and its first president was José Troncoso, who currently names a street in the city. In 1987 the team played professionally in the Premier League of Campeonato Paulista (a championship in the state of São Paulo)

Biribol was invented in the city by the Teacher Dario Miguel Pedro.

== Notable people ==
- Victor Cardoso — volleyball player
- Leonardo Escorpioni — racing driver
- Tabatha Ricci — UFC fighter
