= Malhe sport =

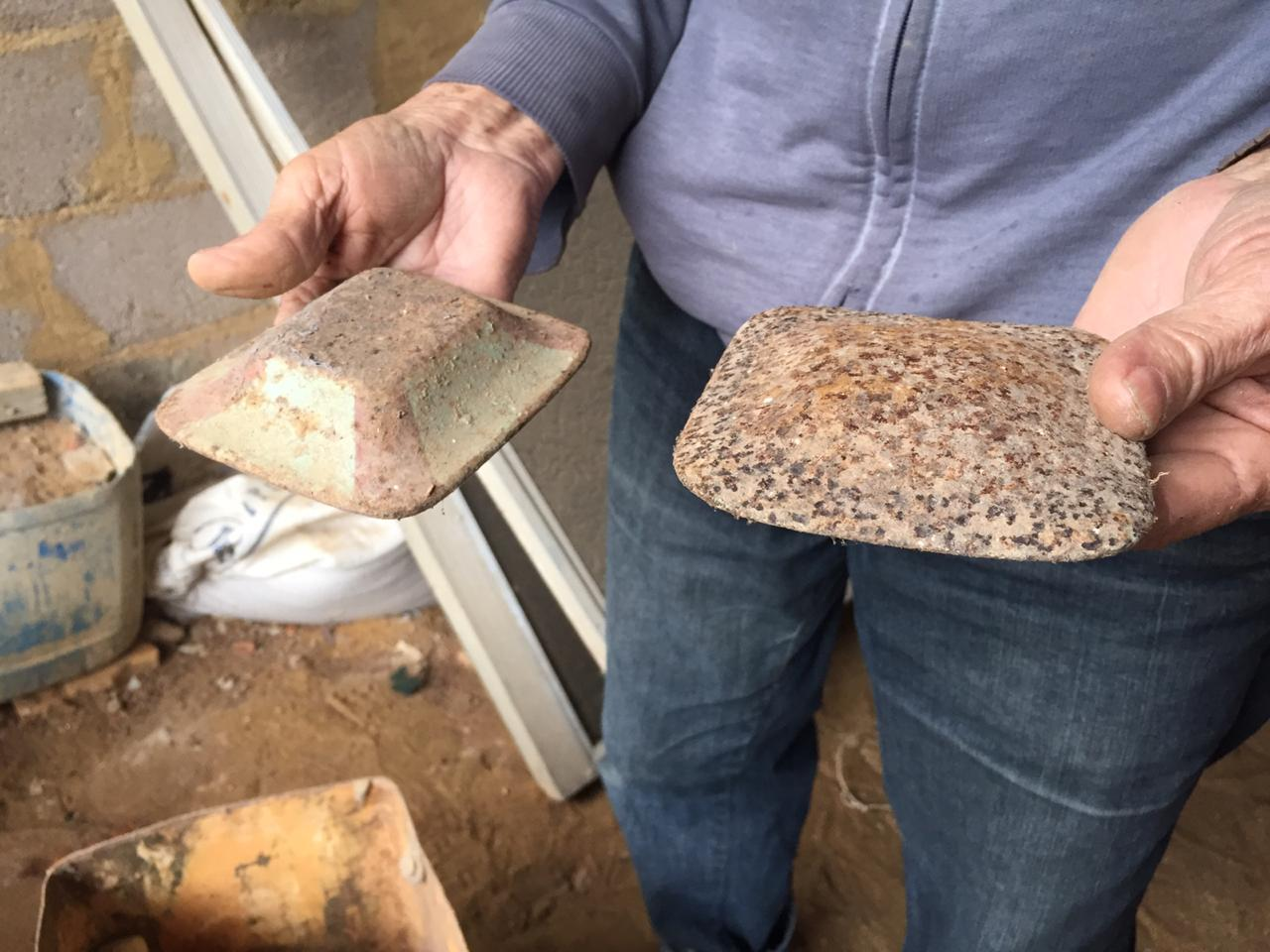
Stones used in the game of fito

The Malhe sport or Jogo da Malha, chinquilho, chincalhão and jogo do fito is a sport originating in Portugal, in which metal discs (or flat stones, in the case of jogo do fito) are thrown towards a pin with the intention of knocking it down and/or leaving the malha (or fito) as close as possible to this pin. The game of malha is a target game related to galocha bigoden, jogo da relha and pétanque.
