= 9-Man (film) =

- Official poster
- Directed by: Ursula Liang
- Produced by: Ursula Liang
- Starring: Kevin Wong; Ty Hua; Jeff Chung; Robert Chung; Ray Szeto; Paul Chin; Patrick "2E" Chin; Wendall Chin; Henry Oi; Jimmy Wong; Wen Wei Lin
- Cinematography: Ursula Liang
- Edited by: Michelle Chang
- Music by: Scott "CHOPS" Jung; Adam Rubenstein
- Release dates: April 27, 2014 (Independent Film Festival Boston); May 5, 2015 (United States)
- Running time: 89 minutes
- Countries: United States; Canada
- Languages: English; Chinese

9-Man is a 2014 American documentary film about the sport 9-man played in Chinatowns in the U.S. and Canada. The New York Times called it "an absorbing documentary."

The film, which had its world premiere at IFFBoston on April 27, 2014, won six film festival awards and was broadcast on the PBS World Channel series America ReFramed on May 5, 2015 and January 24, 2017. The film, which follows the all-male sport of 9-man, was produced by a largely female crew, led by first-time director Ursula Liang and editor Michelle Chang. Featured in the film are U.S. volleyball Olympian and NBC commentator Kevin Wong and Chinatown historian John Kuo Wei Tchen. 9-Man also features the now deceased "mayor" of Boston's Chinatown, Reggie Wong, who was a leader in the 9-man community.

9-Man was part of the SkyFest series on Virgin America airlines in the summer of 2015.

The music for the film was written by Adam Rubenstein and Scott CHOPS Jung, the pioneering Chinese-American hip-hop producer and member of Mountain Brothers.

== Synopsis ==
The documentary follows several modern-day 9-man teams throughout one season framed by a historical portrait of Chinatown history and the game of 9-man. The first act of the film introduces the Boston Knights, Washington CYC (Chinese Youth Club), Toronto Connex, and the Boston Freemasons as they begin the season preparing for competition with other teams. As the first act closes a character from New York Haiyan Townsmen is introduced, and East Coast regional teams compete in the New York Mini tournament crowning an early-season favorite. The second act of the film introduces the history of the game—traveling to Toisan (Taishan), China—and its modern-day rules, which include limiting participation by players who are not "100% Chinese." The sport and isolation of the game are revealed as direct descendants of the Chinese Exclusion Act and racism faced by the community. The final act of the film unites the characters, teams, and conflicts at the NACIVT championship tournament in Boston's Chinatown, setting up Olympian Kevin Wong as the player to beat. As teams fight for the title, they also bring to light the cultural belonging and loss of the modern Chinatown and 9-man community. The film concludes with a scene featuring the funeral of a beloved community member and another scene where 9-man leaders contemplate moving the tournament to a new city—with no Chinatown.

== Awards ==
- Jury Award for Best Feature Documentary, CAAMFest
- Audience Award, Los Angeles Asian Pacific Film Festival
- Special Jury Prize: Best Director, Los Angeles Asian Pacific Film Festival
- Grand Jury Award, Best Documentary Feature, Austin Asian American Film Festival
- Director's Choice Award, Seattle Asian American Film Festival
- Audience Award, Best Feature Documentary, Boston Asian American Film Festival
