= Down a Dark Stairwell =

- DVD cover
- Directed by: Ursula Liang
- Written by: Michelle Chang; J.M. Harper; Ursula Liang
- Produced by: Ursula Liang & Rajal Pitroda
- Edited by: Michelle Chang; J.M Harper
- Music by: Andrew Orkin; Scott "CHOPS" Jung
- Distributed by: Kino Lorber
- Release date: March 2020 (True/Fase Film Festival)
- Languages: English with some Cantonese and Mandarin

Down a Dark Stairwell is a 2020 documentary about the 2014 shooting of Akai Gurley in New York City produced by the film production company Noncompliant Films and directed by Ursula Liang. The documentary made its debut broadcast on the PBS series Independent Lens on April 12, 2021. It was later broadcast on the Criterion Channel and distributed by Kino Lorber on their streaming platform and Kanopy.

== Synopsis ==
In 2014, Akai Gurley was walking with his friend in a dark stairwell of a public housing project when he was shot by NYPD officer Peter Liang. The film covers the events after the shooting and follows a multi-cultural coalition of protesters who support the conviction of Liang. In contrast, the film also follows Asian-American community protesters that argue Liang was used as a scapegoat.

== Awards ==
- Les Blank Award, Best Documentary Feature, Ashland Independent Festival 2020
- Special Jury Recognition, Documentary Feature Editing, Ashland Independent Festival 2020
- Best of Documentary, Indy Film Festival
- Best Documentary Award, Truth to Power, Toronto Reel Asian International Film Festival
- Grand Jury Award, Best Documentary Feature, Los Angeles Asian Pacific Film Festival
- Audience Award, San Diego Asian Film Festival
