= Killing of Akai Gurley =

2014 police shooting in New York City

- Date: November 20, 2014
- Time: c. 11:15 p.m. EST
- Location: Brooklyn, New York City, New York, U.S.
- Participants: Killed: Akai Gurley; Officers: Peter Liang and Shaun Landau
- Deaths: Akai Gurley
- Suspects: Peter Liang
- Charges: Second-degree manslaughter, criminally negligent homicide, second-degree assault, reckless endangerment, two counts of official misconduct
- Convictions: Manslaughter (reduced at sentencing to criminally negligent homicide) official misconduct
- Sentence: Five years of probation
- Litigation: $52 million lawsuit filed by Gurley's family against City of New York

Akai Gurley, a 28-year-old African American man, was fatally shot on November 20, 2014, in Brooklyn, New York City, United States, by a police officer. Two police officers, patrolling stairwells in the New York City Housing Authority (NYCHA)'s Louis H. Pink Houses in East New York, Brooklyn, entered a pitch-dark, unlit stairwell. Officer Peter Liang, 27, had his firearm drawn. Gurley and his girlfriend entered the seventh-floor stairwell, fourteen steps below them. Liang fired his weapon; the shot ricocheted off a wall and fatally struck Gurley in the chest. A jury convicted Liang of 2nd-degree manslaughter, which a court later reduced to criminally negligent homicide.

On February 10, 2015, Officer Liang was indicted by a petit jury (seven men and five women) for manslaughter, assault, and other criminal charges (five counts total) after members were shown footage of the unlit housing project stairway and the 9mm Glock used in the shooting. In evaluating the possibility of equipment failure, they concluded that the 11.5-pound (51-newton) trigger could not have been fired unintentionally. Liang turned himself in to authorities the next day and was arraigned. He was convicted of 2nd-degree manslaughter and official misconduct on February 11, 2016, facing up to 15 years of prison time. The following day (February 12, 2016), Liang's partner, Shaun Landau, was fired by the NYPD.

The conviction galvanized the Chinese community in New York City and across the United States. Many felt that Liang (an Asian American) was being used as a scapegoat; Asian Americans organized rallies in major cities via WeChat, Facebook, Twitter, and email.

On March 28, 2016, prosecuting Brooklyn District Attorney Kenneth P. Thompson recommended to Kings County Supreme Court Judge Danny Chun that Liang serve only house arrest and community service for his sentence. On April 19, 2016, Justice Chun sentenced Liang to five years probation and 800 hours community service after downgrading his manslaughter conviction to criminally negligent homicide.

== Background ==
=== Akai Gurley ===
Akai Kareem Gurley (c. 1986 – November 20, 2014) was born in Saint Thomas, U.S. Virgin Islands, and moved to New York as a child. He was not a resident of the Pink Houses but lived in nearby Brownsville with his domestic partner, her daughter, and their two-year-old daughter. Gurley had a criminal record involving drug-related offenses and served approximately 16 months at Rikers Island before his release in October 2014, one month before his death.

=== Peter Liang ===
Peter Liang (born c. 1987), a Hong Kong American, had less than 18 months of experience with the New York City Police Department (NYPD) at the time of the shooting. Liang emigrated to the United States as a child to Bensonhurst, Brooklyn, with his parents and grandmother; he also has a younger brother in college. Liang had aspired to become a police officer since he was a child.

=== Location ===
In 2012, the Pink Houses were considered to be among the worst housing developments in New York in terms of safety. Patrick Lynch, head of the Patrolmen's Benevolent Association of the City of New York, characterizes them as "among the most dangerous projects in the city" with dimly lit stairwells presenting a particular danger. Police Commissioner William Bratton reported that there had been a spike in violence in the neighborhood over the preceding months with two homicides, two robberies, and four assaults.

Two rookie police officers were assigned to the Pink Houses where they were conducting routine vertical patrols, in which officers scan a public housing complex from the roof to the ground floor, stopping on each level. The New York Daily News initiated rumors that their commander had instructed officers in the area not to carry out vertical patrols and instead to conduct exterior policing, and that the officers were texting their union representative as Gurley lay dying. The rumors were later debunked by the District Attorney's office but the Daily News did not issue a retraction or apology. The NYPD's policy on whether an officer should keep a weapon holstered on such patrols is purposely vague and the decision as to when to take out a firearm is left to the discretion of the officers, according to Police Commissioner Bill Bratton. The department also insists that officers place their fingers on the trigger only upon encountering extreme and particularized danger.

During trial testimony, officers testified they were taught during academy training to have their guns out at times for fear of possible ambush or when they felt unsafe, and that they were specifically trained to take out their firearm as they approached a roof landing as these are considered especially dangerous. One officer testified that cops are taught to beware of a possible ambush on vertical patrols specifically. She also testified of being trained to have her firearm out when approaching a roof landing, finger alongside the trigger. At the time the gun was discharged, the stairwell on the 8th floor was pitch black due to a broken light bulb.

== Shooting ==
Gurley was visiting his girlfriend and getting his hair braided before Thanksgiving. He entered the stairwell on the 7th floor, below Officers Landau and Liang. According to the prosecutors, seconds earlier, Liang, who is left-handed, pulled out his flashlight with his right hand and unholstered his 9mm Glock with his left. He then shoved open the stairwell door with his right shoulder with his gun pointed downwards. It appeared neither side knew the other was there and no words were exchanged, according to authorities. Liang's gun discharged as he opened the door and the bullet ricocheted off the wall and struck Gurley once in the chest. He died within a few minutes. Upon entering, Liang said he heard "a quick sound" to his left which startled him. He turned left and "it just went off when my whole body tensed up," Liang testified. It was reported that Gurley actually ran after hearing the gunshot and collapsed on the fifth floor.

=== Similarity to the shooting of Timothy Stansbury Jr. ===
The fatal shooting of Gurley is notably similar to the shooting death of Timothy Stansbury Jr. that occurred in January 2004. Officer Richard Neri killed Stansbury, 19, on a roof of the Louis Armstrong Houses in Brooklyn at about 1 am. He had approached the rooftop door with his gun drawn. A grand jury declined to indict Neri on charges of criminally negligent homicide, declaring the event an accident based on testimony that he had unintentionally fired. He asserted to have been startled when Stansbury pushed open a rooftop door in a place where drug dealing was rampant.

== Aftermath ==
New York City Police Commissioner William Bratton declared the shooting to be an accident and that Gurley was a "total innocent." Kings County District Attorney Kenneth P. Thompson said that he planned to impanel a grand jury to look into the shooting. Media initially reported that both officers had text-messaged their union representatives before calling for help; the claim was refuted as being false by both the police union and the District Attorney's office.

When asked by reporters, Mayor Bill de Blasio did not take any sides in this issue, commenting that it was a "tragedy" to Gurley's family and requesting respect to the court's verdict. On the issue of NYPD patrolling, he considered it essential to public safety; he also characterized the notions of Liang being a scapegoat^{[16]} and police brutality cases somehow being linked together to be non-existent.

Gurley's funeral was conducted December 6 at the Brown Memorial Baptist Church in Fort Greene. Initially Al Sharpton offered to speak at the service but stepped down after a dispute within the family. Instead, activist Kevin Powell spoke at the service. Gurley is interred at Rosedale Memorial Park in Linden, New Jersey.

The continued conduct of vertical patrols has also been scrutinized in the wake of Gurley's shooting. Police Commissioner Bratton has said that the patrols are needed to reduce crime and vertical patrols continue to be conducted in the Pink Houses. On February 5, 2016, while Liang's trial was underway, two NYPD officers were wounded while conducting vertical patrols at a housing development in the Bronx.

=== Reactions ===
==== Chinese-Americans ====
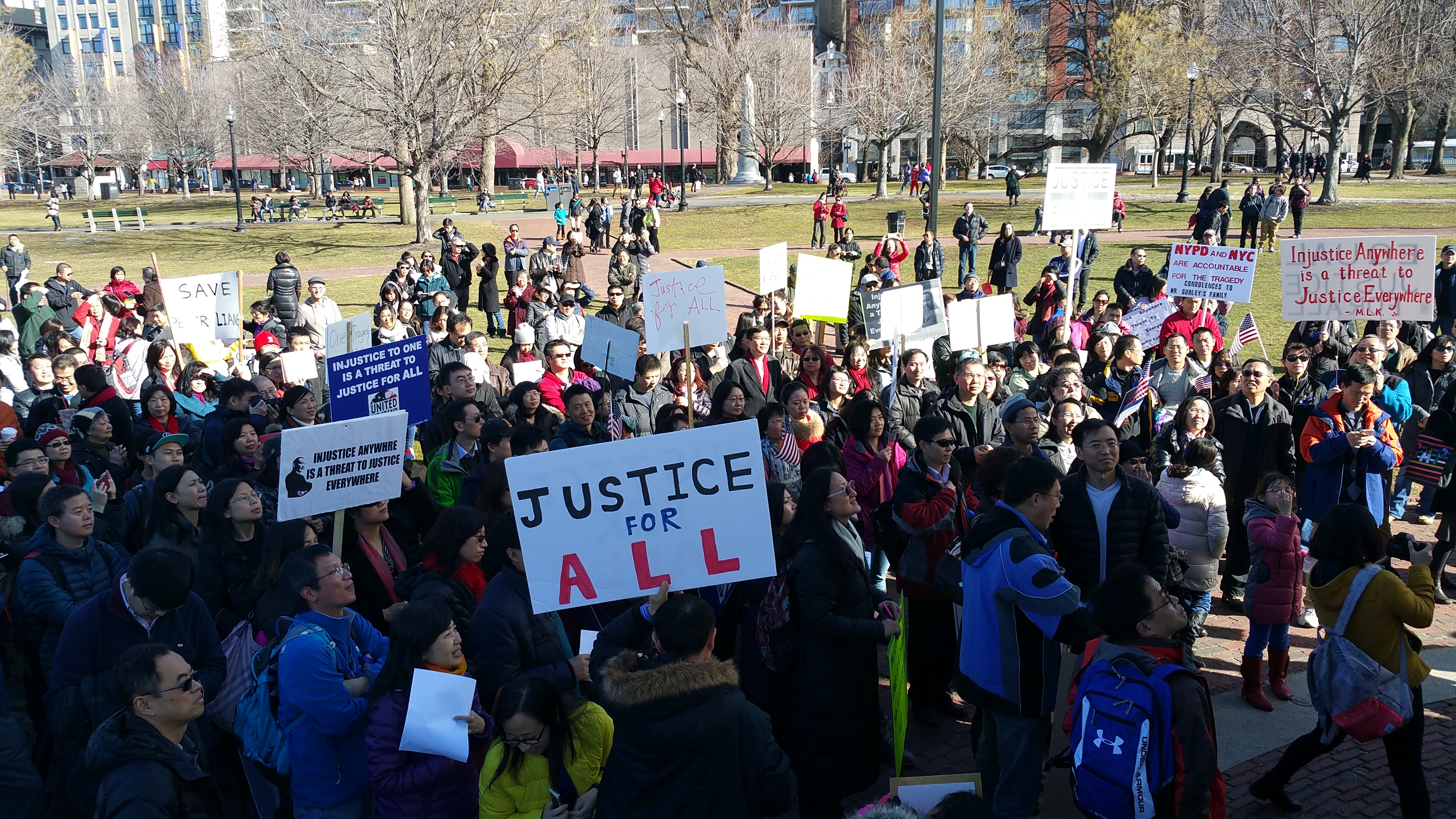
Protestors supporting Peter Liang on February 20, 2016, at Boston Common

More than 3,000 protesters, mostly of Chinese descent, showed up at New York City Hall in March 2015 to support Liang. Thousands walked across the Brooklyn Bridge to Manhattan's Chinatown in April to demand the charges to be dropped, as had been done in the past with white officers.

There were differing opinions among Liang's supporters, with some feeling he should not have been prosecuted at all while others felt he should have been given a lesser charge—but all agreed the system needed to change. State Assemblyman Ron Kim stated, "I do not believe true justice prevailed. Our system failed Gurley and it failed Liang. It pitted the unjust death of an innocent young black man against the unjust scapegoating of a young Asian police officer who was frightened, poorly trained, and who committed a terrible accident."

Nearly 15,000 people protested on behalf of Liang in New York on February 20, 2016, with similar turnouts across the United States that day. Many of Liang's supporters demanded that all killers should be prosecuted and that there should be no such thing as selective prosecution, scapegoating, or racism. Joseph Lin, a real estate agent and activist, had helped to organize the protests due to feeling that Asian Americans had been too passive with no political voice, saying that, "If he's a black officer, I guarantee you Al Sharpton will come out. If he's Hispanic, all the congressmen will come out. But no, he's a Chinese, so no one is coming out."

New York City Councilwoman Margaret Chin stated she was satisfied with the grand jury indictment of Liang but asked for leniency in Liang's sentencing. Brooklyn politicians Mark Treyger and William Colton had often spoken on the behalf of the Chinese community.

==== Black Lives Matter movement ====
Gurley's death was one of several police killings of African Americans protested by the Black Lives Matter movement. On December 27, 2014, 200 people marched in Brooklyn to protest the fatal shooting of Gurley on the same day as the funeral for slain NYPD Officer Rafael Ramos, who was a victim of the 2014 killings of NYPD officers, despite calls from the mayor to postpone demonstrations.

=== Legal proceedings ===
On February 10, 2015, Officer Liang was indicted by a grand jury for the shooting death of Gurley. He was charged with second-degree manslaughter, criminally negligent homicide, second-degree assault, reckless endangerment, and two counts of official misconduct. Liang had a court date on February 11, and turned himself in that day. He pleaded not guilty to the charges and was released without having to post bond, and suspended from his job without pay. His trial started on January 25, 2016. Liang was convicted of manslaughter and official misconduct on February 11, 2016, and he was immediately dismissed by the Police Department. Liang faced anywhere from no jail to a maximum of 15 years of prison when sentenced in April. His lawyers submitted an appeal to Judge Danny Chun while Liang remained free without bail. Delores Jones-Brown, a professor at the John Jay College of Criminal Justice, speculated to The Atlantic that Liang would have avoided conviction had he rendered aid to Gurley, while jurors later reported that the force required for them to pull the trigger on a police-issued pistol led them to believe that Liang's testimony was not completely true.

Landau, the other officer involved, was not criminally implicated in Gurley's death. However, he was fired from the NYPD the day after his partner was convicted. Landau, like Liang, was also within his two-year probationary period and his firing after the trial was permitted by his contract. Landau testified at the trial of his former partner under immunity from prosecution, describing Liang as having been in shock. He said that neither of them tried to revive Gurley, with both of them saying they did not feel qualified to perform CPR. According to Landau, his instructor at the police academy helped them to cheat on the exams. Both radioed for an ambulance as Gurley's girlfriend performed CPR.

On April 19, 2016, Justice Chun reduced Liang's conviction from manslaughter to criminally negligent homicide then sentenced Liang to five years of probation and 800 hours community service. He believed Liang would be much more productive spending time in community service.

=== Arguments used in court ===
Assistant District Attorney Joseph Alexis claimed the killing wasn't an accident and that Liang chose to place the finger on the trigger. However, one of Liang's defense attorneys, Rae Koshetz, argued that what had happened was a tragedy, not a crime, because the bullet had bounced off a wall and coincidentally hit Gurley. Koshetz and another attorney for Liang, Robert Brown, argued that Liang was in a state of shock after his gun went off and did not realize that he hit anyone.

The defendants also argued that Liang pulling out his gun was still considered in line with protocol because the "lack of lighting is commonly perceived as a sign of criminal activity." Furthermore, the light had been out of service for a number of days without repair. After Liang's bullet ricocheted off the wall and struck Gurley in the chest, the officers did not render CPR.

=== Ending ===
In August 2016, New York City reached an agreement with Gurley's family (who had filed a $52 million lawsuit) for $4.1 million and settled a lawsuit brought by Kimberley Ballinger, mother of Gurley's daughter, Akaila. The New York Housing Authority paid $400,000 and Liang paid $25,000. The money went into a fund for Akaila, who was then two-years old. She can access the funds after she turns 18, with the court's approval.

After the settlement of Liang's trial, about $260,000 of the money raised for Liang's defence was returned to the donors. About $325,000 was given to Liang's family and $80,000 was to be used for Chinese communities.

=== Media coverage ===
The incident received national and international coverage, in part due to the recent police shooting of Michael Brown in Ferguson, Missouri, and killing of Eric Garner in Staten Island.

The New York City Police Department's practice of vertical patrols was also criticized. The Village Voice described the incident as part of a year of public relations disasters for the NYPD. Other coverage has focused on the maintenance and public safety issues that led to the death.

The incident is the subject of the 2020 feature documentary Down a Dark Stairwell.

A Shot Through the Wall, a 2021 independent film, was based on the incident.

=== Other influence ===
On February 12, 2016, Gurley's family demanded the NYPD permanently end all vertical patrols. They requested Landau be fired from the department and for the city to invest in programs like affordable housing, community centers, and after-school programs, instead of hiring more NYPD officers.

== See also ==
- List of unarmed African Americans killed by law enforcement officers in the United States
- List of killings by law enforcement officers in the United States
