= Louis Heaton Pink Houses =

Public housing development in Brooklyn, New York

- NYCHA property
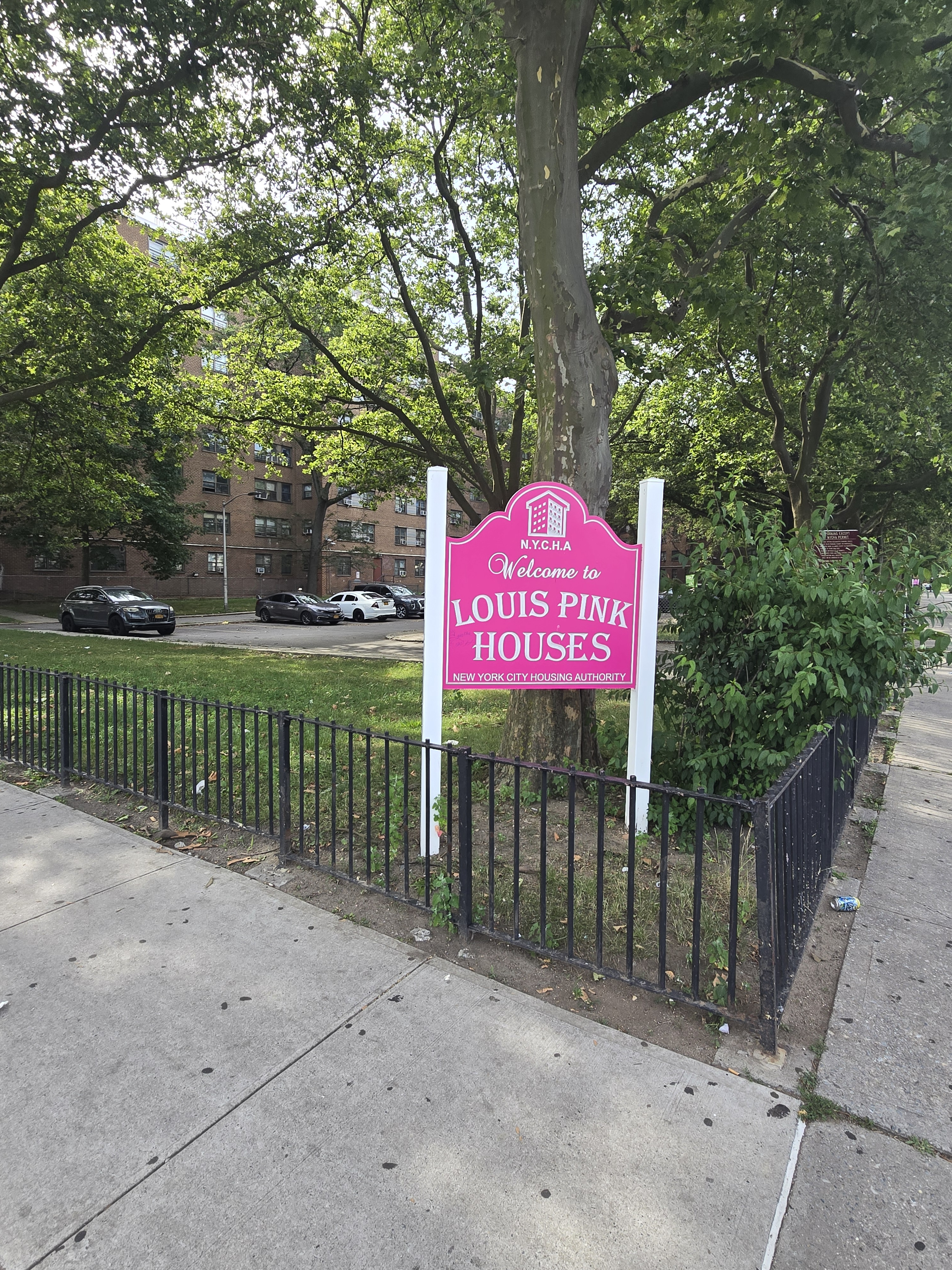
- Nickname: Pink Houses
- Interactive map of Louis Heaton Pink Houses
- Coordinates: 40.668300°N 73.866990°W
- Country: United States
- State: New York
- City: New York City
- Borough: Brooklyn
- ZIP codes: 11208
- Area codes: 718, 347, 929, and 917

The Louis Heaton Pink Houses or Pink Houses are a housing project in New York City that were established in the East New York neighborhood in Brooklyn in 1959. It consists of 22 eight-storey buildings with 1,500 apartment units over a 31.1-acre expanse, bordered by Crescent Street, Linden Boulevard, Elderts Lane, and Stanley Avenue. It is owned and managed by New York City Housing Authority (NYCHA).

== Development ==
Construction of the Pink Houses began in the summer of 1957 and was designed by architects Aldoph Goldberg and Herbert Epstein. The development was completed on September 30, 1959. It was named after a former member of NYCHA, Louis Heaton Pink who was a pioneer of low and middle-income housing. The first eight families moving in March of that year. The project cost $21 million. The site is cut through by two streets, which form four superblocks with buildings on only 14% of the site. Each cluster of buildings contains its own playground maintained by the Parks Department.

In 2015, Pink Houses Resident Green Committee and East New York Farms partnered to create the Pink Houses Community Farm.

== Disinvestment ==
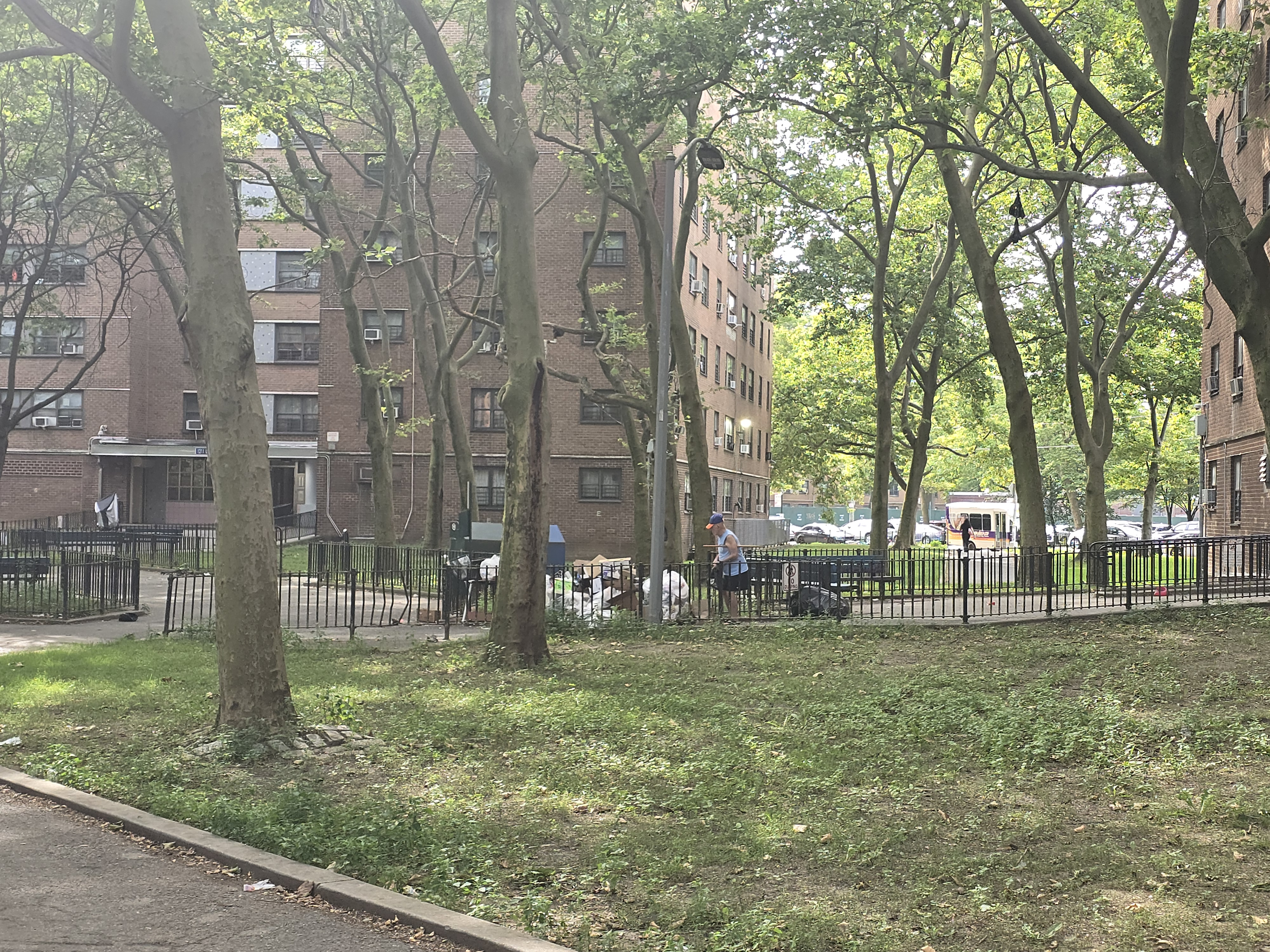
The grounds of the Louis Heaton Pink houses

NYCHA properties, including the Pink Houses, used to be a reliable option for its residents and people in need and used to combat the slums in the city. In 2000, the government decided to disinvest in NYCHA and took billions of dollars away from the agency. As a result of disinvestment, many of the residents have faced issues with living safely and comfortably in the Pink Houses. In one case, residents of the complex were not able to get heating during the winter. Even though the boilers were fully functioning, the people in charge of running the building did not want to turn the boiler on and many residents had to use multiple blankets to keep warm during the freezing temperatures which impacts their social determinants of health. In another incident, a resident complained about how lights in the stairway had not been functioning for at least three years, contributing to one of the many factors that has encouraged violent crime, weapons, and drugs in the Pink Houses. Not only has safety been affected, but daily errands such as collecting the mail has now also come into question. The mailboxes have not been functioning for a good number of months, creating the inconvenience of forcing residents from multiple floors of the complex to go to the local post office to collect their mail. The falsely certified lead based paint inspections throughout the building in 2015, the city has been forced to reinvest billions into all of the housing projects of New York including the Pink Houses which had 582 current work orders, and 92 outstanding department of building violations in 2015.

== Shooting of Akai Gurley ==
Following an NYPD accidental killing of unarmed Pink Houses resident Akai Gurley in 2014, concerns were raised by city officials regarding NYCHA's practices citing chronic problems in the Pink Houses and other developments including broken windows and burned-out light bulbs as being deemed "maintenance repairs" rather than "emergency repairs" by the agency. Comptroller Scott Stringer also launched an audit of the NYCHA finding they failed to secure $353 million in federal funds that could have been used for lighting repairs, and losing out on a total of $700 million in revenue and saving.

The shooting also raised concerns about the New York City Police Department's (NYPD) role in policing NYCHA developments regarding the practice of vertical patrols, officers using their discretion to draw their weapon, and federal housing subsidies being funneled to the NYPD. The practice of vertical patrols has been seen by civil rights advocates as leading to the baseless questioning and searching of residents, similar to stop-and-frisk. The NYPD and Mayor Bill de Blasio defended the practice even though the police guide cites its hazards, warning its officers to be on guard for a “possible ambush.” The NYPD later ended vertical patrols and stop-and-frisk at NYCHA developments.

== See also ==
- New York City Housing Authority
- List of New York City Housing Authority properties
