= List of killings by law enforcement officers in the United States, 2004 =

This is a list of people reported killed by non-military law enforcement officers in the United States in 2004, whether in the line of duty or not, and regardless of reason or method. The listing documents the occurrence of a death, making no implications regarding wrongdoing or justification on the part of the person killed or officer involved. Killings are arranged by date of the incident that caused death. Different death dates, if known, are noted in the description. The table below lists 120 people.

== 2004 ==
Date	Name (age) of deceased	State (city)	Description
2004-12-30	Unnamed man	Tennessee (Memphis) (?)	
2004-12-29	Unnamed person	Iowa (Glenwood)	
2004‑12‑28	Michael Madonna	Idaho (Hayden)	Shot after shooting a policeman. Officers were questioning Madonna about an earlier hit-and-run accident when he fled into his house and retrieved a gun.
2004-12-27 (?)	Unnamed man	California (Los Angeles)	
2004-12-25	Unnamed man (20s)	New Jersey (Irvington)	
2004-12-25	Andrey Clancy (19)	Massachusetts (Lowell)	
2004-12-25	Unnamed man	California (Gardena)	The man, suspected of a carjacking, ran into a crowded casino and took two people hostage.
2004-12-24	Unnamed man (40s)	Arizona (Tucson)	
2004-12-24	Howard Henry Post (32)	Pennsylvania (Glen Lyon)	
2004-12-24	Unnamed man	Minnesota (Mankato)	
2004-12-24	Dale R. Varney (38)	Wisconsin (Tomah)	
2004-12-24	Rodney Allen Miller (45)	Minnesota (Beauford)	Shot by State patrolman while unarmed. Officer stated vehicle was in motion and shooting deemed justified.
2004-12-24	Daniel Pino (17)	Colorado (Pueblo)	
2004-12-23	Juan Herrera	California (Buena Park)	Herrera and another person were pulled over for a traffic violation. Herrera then drove away from the officers as they were going towards the driver's-side window, initiating a vehicle pursuit. After his Oldsmobile was blocked by a patrol car, Buena Park police officer, Ron Furtado, ran up to the driver's-side window and ordered Herrera to put his hands up. Furtado then shot Herrera in the head as he was allegedly leaning over the seat to grab a weapon.
2004-12-23	Joey Cervantez (20)	California (Cutler)	
2004-12-18	Matthew Jones (16)	Idaho (Boise)	
2004-12-18	Unnamed man (40s)	Kansas (Kansas City)	
2004-12-17	Keith Johnson (16)	Missouri (St. Louis)	
2004-12-17	Mateo Baltazar (23)	Nebraska (Omaha)	
2004-12-16	Unnamed mentally ill man	Connecticut (New Haven)	
2004-12-15	Unnamed man (20s)	Pennsylvania (North Philadelphia)	
2004-12-14	Unnamed man	California (Davis)	
2004-12-12	Ryan Amend (20)	Indiana (Crawfordsville)	
2004-12-12	James F. Hammons Sr. (75)	Kentucky (Louisvilla)	Hammons was "mostly deaf and had Parkinson's disease."
2004-12-11	Unnamed man	Kentucky (Cartersville)	
2004-12-10	Carleton Lockhart (32)	New York (Bronx)	
2004-12-09	Tracy J. White (44)	Iowa (Des Moines)	
2004-12-08	Nathan Gale (25)	Ohio (Columbus)	At a Damageplan concert, Gale shot and killed Dimebag Darrell and three others before being killed by police.
2004-12-07	William Gearhart (46)	Florida (St. Petersburg)	
2004-12-04	Unnamed man (24)	California (Los Angeles)	
2004-12-02	Willie Thomas Grigsby (24)	Oregon (Portland)	
2004-11-30	Melvin Y. Dubon (32)	Maryland (Laurel)	
2004-11-27	Jeremy Andre Cervantes (19)	California (Los Angeles)	
2004-11-27	Unnamed man	California (Whittier)	
2004-11-26	Andrew Marcello Osura (22)	Michigan (Kentwood)	
2004-11-24	Brian O'Connor (42)	New York (Ilion)	Ilion and Herkimer police were attempting to execute warrants for weapon possession. O'Connor opened fire on the police, and was shot to death in the ensuing shootout.
2004-11-22	Jose Feliciano (44)	New York (Brooklyn)	Shot when he didn't drop the metal casing of a light fixture he was holding.
2004-11-22	Unnamed man	Oregon (Portland)	
2004-11-16	Nishan Bernard (22)	Arizona (Tucson)	
2004-11-11	Dennis Crawford	Michigan (Detroit)	Crawford was unarmed and was killed by Laron York and Barron Townsend. According to reports "York shot him four times, once in the back, once in the head, and twice in the leg." The mother of Crawford's son claims that Crawford was shot 15 times in an online report. In addition, the federal lawsuit was settled with the Crawford family for an undisclosed amount.
2004-11-11	Tomas Peck (25)	Ohio (Columbus)	
2004-11-09	Jeffrey Berbert Bothee (52)	Michigan (Kentwood)	
2004-11-09	Michael E. Bell (21)	Wisconsin (Kenosha)	Bell was tased four times and then shot in the head by officer Albert Gonzalez after a traffic stop. Four officers were involved. Gonzalez killed Bell after officer Erich Strausbaugh called out "He's got my gun!", referring to Bell, but his gun was actually caught on a car's side mirror. Bell was unarmed. The incident occurred in Bell's driveway while his mother and sister watched. Bell's family received a $1.75 million settlement in a civil suit in March 2010, and used the money to raise awareness about the case. Officer Strausbaugh killed himself in October 2010. As of May 2013, the state of Wisconsin has filed no charges against the officers involved.
2004-11-08	Mack Lucky (57)	Connecticut (New Haven)	
2004-11-04	Booker Carloss II (50)	California (Oakland)	
2004-11-01	James Alan Walters (40)	California (Bakersfield)	Walters was shot by Kern County Sheriffs deputies after a standoff outside his home.
2004-10-29	Jose Leonides-Marquez (31)	Virginia (Dale City)	
2004-10-29	Amy Donovan (37)	Texas (Austin)	Donovan, a police officer, was struck and killed by her police partner with a patrol car.
2004-10-28	Unnamed man (70)	Illinois (Chicago)	
2004-10-28	Unnamed man	New Jersey (Woodbine)	
2004-10-27	Gayle Marie Price (48)	Michigan (Iron Mountain)	
2004-10-24	Randy Carlos Baker (49)	Florida (Miami)	
2004-10-24	Courtney Williams (15)	Minnesota (Minneapolis)	
2004-10-24	Unnamed man	Virginia (Richmond)	
2004-10-22	Oscar "Oz" Young (22)	New Jersey (Camden)	
2004-10-22	Eric J. Miller (34)	California (Fountain Valley)	
2004-10-21	Victoria Snelgrove (21)	Massachusetts (Boston)	Shooting of Victoria Snelgrove: Following Game 7 of the American League Championship Series, in which the Boston Red Sox beat the New York Yankees, police officer used crowd-control projectiles on a crowd. One projectile accidentally hit Snelgrove, who was not a part of the crowd, in the eye.
2004-10-19	Francisco Campos (36)	Oregon (Lincoln City)	
2004-10-10	Unnamed man	Washington (Seattle)	
2004-10-09	David Michael Badovinac	Colorado (Colorado Springs)	Shot after shooting at police.
2004-10-09	Gregory Chavis (19)	New York (Bronx)	While leaving a movie theater Chavis and his friends got into a verbal altercation with another group, and Chavis was shot by an unknown person. He was left bleeding on the sidewalk. His family and a witness contended that NYPD deliberately delayed medical attention for half an hour, with Lincoln Hospital only a block away, and caused Chavis's death. In a wrongful death proceeding the state's defense included the assertion that "Chavis had no constitutional right to medical treatment".
2004-09-27	Boangeres Mota (37)	New York (Manhattan)	Shot and killed after pulling out a derringer pistol.
2004-09-26	Unnamed man (40)	California (San Jose)	
2004-09-24	Kahdir Al Khattab (26)	Indiana (Indianapolis)	
2004-08-30	Rashawn Moody (18)	New York (Brooklyn)	Officers in an unmarked car were parked at a car wash when a robbery unfolded. The officers were allegedly shot at. They then returned 26 rounds. At least five rounds struck and killed Moody. Three suspects were taken into custody.
2004-08-12	Unnamed man	California (San Jose)	
2004-08-04	Joseph Williams (22)	Louisiana (New Orleans)	
2004-07-16	Unnamed man	New York (Oak Beach)	
2004-07-12	Unnamed person	Delaware (Smyrna)	
2004-07-11	Frank Lobato (63)	Colorado (Denver)	Lobato, a disabled homeless man, was shot and killed while watching television in bed. Police mistook his soda can for a weapon.
2004-07-07	Thomas Moulton (41)	Maine (Westbrook)	
2004-07-02	Luiz Gonzalez (57)	Massachusetts (Boston)	
2004-07	James LaRue	Colorado (Colorado Springs)	Shot after pointing gun at police and using officer's Taser on two officers.
2004-06-28	Craig Parro (45)	Tennessee (Franklin)	
2004-06-27	Burt Bowen (40)	Massachusetts (Boston)	
2004-06-20	Juan Huerta (47)	New York (Manhattan)	Shot and killed in the subway system after robbing a 66-year-old man. No weapon was recovered from Huerta's body.
2004-06-20	Unnamed man	Pennsylvania (Columbia)	
2004-06-10	Unnamed man	California (Porterville)	
2004-06-04	Dennis Kissel (60)	Connecticut (Seymour)	Kissel, an Oxford-based optometrist, made an appointment at another optometrist's office under a fake name. When he met the other optometrist, Kissel shot him with a revolver. After the victim and his assistant wrestled the gun away from Kissel, they shut him in an exam room. When officers arrived, Kissel lunged at them holding a screwdriver, and officers fatally shot him.
2004-05-29	Unnamed man	Virginia (Richmond)	
2004-05-13	Deborah Kerr (43)	Michigan (Port Huron)	
2004-05-07	Michael Hartigan (58)	Arizona (Tucson)	
2004-04-30	Unnamed man (28)	Missouri (St. Louis)	
2004-04-29	Arlington Wilson Jr. (21)	Ohio (Cleveland)	
2004-04-25	Unnamed man	Arizona (Phoenix)	
2004-04-16	Unnamed man	Florida (Palm Beach)	
2004-04-14	Donald Bochat (31)	California (Farmersville)	Wanted for shooting and wounding a California Highway Patrol Officer on April 10, Bochat was found in a Farmersville residence but he fled in a vehicle. Officers shot at the vehicle, disabling it. When he emerged from the vehicle, rifle in hand, he was shot and killed by officers.
2004-04-14	Donald Bochat (31)	California (Visalia)	
2004-04-13	Jimmy Blakey (28)	Kentucky (Stanford)`	
2004-04-04	Phillip Camacho (42)	Arizona (Tucson)	
2004-04-01	Unnamed man	Montana (Butte)	
2004-03-28	James Jahar Akbar Perez	Oregon (Portland)	Perez was pulled over for failure to signal a turn. After some kind of altercation (witnesses say he did not even take off his seatbelt, and he was unarmed), officer Jason Sery fired three rounds into his vehicle. A grand jury found no criminal wrongdoing on the part of the officer.
2004-03-26	Keith Stratton (40)	Indiana (Rolling Prairie)	
2004-03-12	Bette Hodoe	Pennsylvania (Philadelphia)	
2004-03-10	Unnamed man	Alabama (Mobile)	
2004-03-10	Leroy Smalls (41)	New York (Manhattan)	Shot to death in a housing project by two plainclothes detectives.
2004-03-03	Eren Beyah (27)	Ohio (Cleveland)	
2004-03-??	Sean Francis Mafnas School	Guam	
2004-02-27	Unnamed man	Kansas (Peculiar)	
2004-02-26	Unnamed man	New Jersey (Elizabeth)	
2004-02-23	Nicholas Killinger (23)	California (Santa Monica)	
2004-02-20	Herman Jackson	Georgia (Sylvester)	Died from broken larynx suffered as a police officer wrapped his arm around Jackson's neck to subdue him during an arrest.
2004-02-18	Jean Hankins (50)	Ohio (Bedford Heights)	
2004-02-18	Jonathan Davis	Wisconsin (Kenosha)	
2004-02-18	Robin Johnson (45)	Arizona (Tucson)	
2004-02-17	Rodolfo Cardenas (43)	California (San Jose)	Cardenas was shot and killed by California Bureau of Narcotic Enforcement agent Michael Walker in downtown San Jose. Walker mistook Cardenas for a wanted fugitive, and shot him during a foot chase. Cardenas engaged in a car chase with Walker before the foot chase, and Walker claimed Cardenas had a weapon on him and was pulling it out before he shot him. Walker was charged with voluntary manslaughter but was found not guilty. In 2006, Cardenas' family received $1 million from a federal civil rights lawsuit.
2004-02-15	Unnamed man	New York (Bronx)	
2004-02-12	Wayne Scott (45)	New Jersey (Plainfield)	
2004-02-11	Scott Stumbris (40)	Arizona (Tucson)	
2004-02-08	Wilson Alba (31)	New York (Brooklyn)	Shot & killed by off-duty Customs Service inspector Martin Carrington.
2004-02-03	Beau Weierheuser (19)	Iowa (Muscatine)	
2004-01-30	Leslie Fredrickson (52)	Minnesota (Fergus Falls)	
2004-01-23	Javier Beas (19)	California (Pomona)	
2004-01-18	Brandon Robinson (24)	Ohio (Cleveland)	
2004-01-14	James Alexander (62)	Kentucky (Jenkins)	
2004-01-13	Terry James Chaney	Georgia (Lilburn)	Shot after shooting at deputies. Officers were responding to a report of a home invasion where two people were killed. Officers chased the suspect into the woods where he shot at them.
2004-01-11	Unnamed man	California (Corona)	
2004-01-10	Newton Satahoo (48)	Florida (Sunrise)	
2004-01-09	Joshua Duncan (27)	California (Bakersfield)	Two Bakersfield police officers were investigating a report of attempted burglary in a mobile home park. The officers said they fired their weapons when the suspect drove a car toward them. The passenger in the car was wounded by police gunfire.
2004-01-04	Timothy Stansbury	New York (New York City)	Timothy Stansbury

== See also ==
- Death in custody § United States
- Henry A. Wallace Police Crime Public Database
- List of cases of police brutality
- List of countries with annual rates and counts for killings by law enforcement officers
- List of law enforcement officers killed in the line of duty in the United States
- List of law enforcement officers convicted for an on-duty killing in the United States
- List of shootings by US immigration agents
- List of police reforms related to the George Floyd protests
- List of unarmed African Americans killed by law enforcement officers in the United States
- Lists of killings by law enforcement officers
- Police brutality in the United States
- Police misconduct § United States
- Police riot § United States
- Police use of deadly force in the United States
