= Dickens Otim =

- Born: 1987/07/27
- Citizenship: Ugandan
- Occupation: Volleyball player

Dickens Otim (born 27 July, 1987) is a Ugandan professional volleyball player. He plays as a setter in the Ugandan men's volleyball team.

== Education ==
Dickens was born to a family of Akello Grace and Washington Okao in Lira District. He attended V.H. Primary School for primary education, Dr. Obote College Lira for his Uganda Certificate of Education, Katikamu SDA for his Uganda Advanced Certificate of Education, and Nkumba University for his tertiary education.

== Career ==
Otim began his career with Nkumba Navy, In 2014, he joined Sport-S volleyball where he became team captain. He currently plays for UCU team under Serie-A Men league.

=== Awards ===
- MVP 2011, 2012, and 2014 acolades.
