= Chops (music producer) =

American rapper

Scott Jung
- Also known as: CHOPS
- Origin: Philadelphia, U.S.
- Genres: Various
- Occupations: Producer, musician, songwriter, rapper
- Instruments: Piano, keyboards, guitar, drums
- Years active: 1993–present
- Labels: Ruffhouse Records (U.S.); Pimpstrut Records (U.S.); Babygrande Records (U.S.)
- Website: www.chopsmusic.com

CHOPS is the stage name of Scott Robert Jung, also known as Scott Chops Jung, an American hip hop producer, rapper and former member of the Asian American Hip-Hop group, the Mountain Brothers. Jung grew up in Philadelphia and has Chinese ancestry. While with Mountain Brothers, he became known for using a combination of programmed and live instruments in his work, as opposed to sampling the work of others. Since the disbanding of the Mountain Brothers, CHOPS has worked primarily as a producer, with his most high-profile piece being the critically acclaimed 2011 video for Lonely Island entitled "The Creep."

== Early life ==
Chops and his family were constantly moving from place to place, so he rarely made any long-lasting friendships. He did share a common interest with his brother in making music. Chops' passion for making beats began with his friend from high school. His friend brought a device to school that transformed Chop's life forever. It was a drum machine, and Chops began to copy beats from his favorite song, “Walk This Way” by Run DMC. After that, making beats became his life. Since his family was constantly on the move, music was the one thing that would never change, so his mother bought him an electric keyboard and his brother a guitar. Chops always got support from his mother and brother. “My brother has a band and I do mostly key.” Chops enrolled in many music courses while attending Penn State, but did not major in music. His parents discouraged him from majoring in music because they thought it would not result in a stable career.

== Strength in Numbers ==
After the Mountain Brothers went their own ways Chops continued producing music. After Chops became a father, he started to question how he could contribute to the world in order for it to better for his daughter. This led to Chops’ creation of the album Strength in Numbers, which consists of collaborations with talented Asian American artists and himself. Strength in Numbers was completed over a period of two years, beginning in 2011. Chops wanted this album to be a great reflection of Asian American artists with great talent. Chops wanted people to dismantle stereotypes and let the music speak for itself instead of being influenced by the way the artists look. Chops, like other Asian American artists, have felt prejudged for being incapable of creating great music because of their ethnicity. When Chops was in the Mountain Brothers, the group would step on stage and everybody would assume their music would not be good and stereotype them, but after they performed the crowd would be amazed by their talents. “I remember this one guy connected with a big label that said, ‘You know what ya should do? Wear karate suits and hit gongs, ya know what I mean? Stuff like that, stuff with yo culture.’ I was born in New Jersey man.” With relatively few Asian American rappers in the mainstream, Chops believes that this album is a way for everybody to witness that Asian Americans, like artists of all other races, have the talent and should be acknowledged. Strength in Numbers consists of the contributions of over 30 artists.

== Film score composing ==
Chops also composed the original score for Ursula Liang's documentary 9-Man (film) (2014), about a sport played by Chinese American men in New York City. The film won a Best Documentary award at the 2014 CAAMFest, as well as a Special Jury Prize for Best Director - Documentary Feature and an Audience Award for Documentary Feature from the 2014 Los Angeles Asian Pacific Film Festival. The documentary was also nominated for the Halekulani Golden Orchid Award for Best Documentary at the 2014 Hawaii International Film Festival and the Grand Jury Prize for Best Documentary Feature at the 2014 Los Angeles Asian Pacific Film Festival.

== Discography ==
=== Film scores ===
- 9-Man (film) (2014), Directed by Ursula Liang

=== With the Mountain Brothers ===
- 1999: Self: Volume 1 (Self Released)
- 2002: Microphone Phenomenal (Babygrande Records)
- 2003: Triple Crown (Babygrande Records)

=== Albums ===
- 2003: Food For Naught (Day by Day Entertainment, Inc.)
- 2003: My First Break Record (Brick Records)
- 2004: Virtuosity (Good Vibe Recordings)
- 2004: Look What I Found In My Backpack
- 2004: 20 Piece Bucket Breaks (Brick Records)
- 2005: Gangsta Breaks (Brick Records)
- 2006: Dark (Image Music Group)
- 2014: Strength In Numbers

==== Mixtapes ====
- 2002: Hidden Gemz (mixed & hosted by DJ Excel) (Offishal Fully Records)
- 2004: The Chef Vs. The Butcher (with Raekwon, mixed by DJ Lt. Dan)
- 2004: By Hook Or By Crook (with G-Unit, mixed by DJ Lt. Dan)
- 2005: Ol' Dirty Bastard: The Return of Osirus (with DJ Lt. Dan, DJ Strong)
- 2006: It's Going Down: National Champs (with Paul Wall, DJ Clue)
- 2007: 9th Year Freshman (with 9th Wonder)
- 2009: Chops Best Remixes Vol. 1
- 2009: Glass Ceiling
- 2009: Chops Best Remixes Vol. 2
- 2009: A Lot On My Plate But Still Hungry
- 2011: Songs Your Girl Likes

=== Production ===
Bahamadia - BB Queen (2000)

- 3. "Special Forces" (feat. Chops, Rasco, and Planet Asia)

Spaztik Emcee aka Mark Spitz - For Those That Do (2002)

- 2. "Fresh"
- 3. "We Three Kings" (feat. Chops and Grand Agent)
- 5. "Rocksteady" (featuring Darryl Powell)
- 6. "Run of the Mill (remix) (feat. Regina Monique)
- 7. "Expect It (feat Chops)
- 9. "Party People" (feat J-Ro of the Alkaholiks)
- 11. "Pessimistic (Who I Be)
- 12. "Wild, Red, Hot (Remix)" (feat. Rasco)
- 13. "High" (feat. Bigfoot)
- 14. "First Assignment" (feat Dave Ghetto & Sun)

Hieroglyphics – Hiero Imperium Presents: The Corner (2005)

- 10. Everybody's Gangsta

Ol Dirty Bastard - Osirus (2006)

- 3. "Go Go Go" (feat. Blahzay Blahzay)
- 9. "Don't Stop Ma (Out of Control)"
- 12. "Down South"

DJ Clue? - The Professional 3 (2006)

- 9."Grill and Woman" - (by Mike Jones, Paul Wall and Bun B)

==== Young Jeezy - The Inspiration (2006) ====
- 19. "National Anthem" (iTunes bonus track)

==== Chamillionaire - Ultimate Victory (2007) ====
- 16. "We Breakin Up"

==== Bun B - II Trill (2008) ====
- 03. "Damn I'm Cold" (feat. Lil Wayne)
- 18. "Keep It 100"

==== Sway - The Signature LP (2008) ====
- 11. "Stereo"

==== San Quinn - "From A Boy to a Man" (2008) ====
- 04. "Double Dose of Gangsta" (featuring CHOPS)
- 17. "Devotion" (featuring Too Short, Mistah F.A.B. and Chops)

Keak Da Sneak "Deified" (2008)

- 19. "I Get It In" (featuring San Quinn, Chops & Bra Heff)

All City (San Quinn, Big Rich, Boo Banga) - 41 Feva (2008)

- "Get It Anyway We Can"

Keak Da Sneak and San Quinn "Welcome To Scokland"

- 2. "Welcome to Scokland"
- 4. Streetz Don't Lie

==== Chamillionaire - Venom (2010) ====
- 00. "The Main Event"

Nappy Roots - Pursuit of Nappyness (2010)

- 6. "How I Do"
- 11. "Know About Me"
- 14. "Paint A Picture"
- 16 "All For You"

==== The Lonely Island - Turtleneck & Chain (2011) ====
- 13. "The Creep" featuring Nicki Minaj and John Waters

Bambu - ... one rifle per family (2012)

- 4. "Rent Money" (featuring Rocky Rivera)

The Lonely Island - The Wack Album (2013)

- 10."I'm a Hustler (Song?)"
- 12."I Run NY" (featuring Billie Joe Armstrong)
