= John Kuo Wei Tchen =

Historian of Chinese-American history

John Kuo Wei Tchen, also known as Jack, is a historian of Chinese American history and the Inaugural Clement A. Price Chair in Public History and Humanities at Rutgers University.

== Biography ==
Tchen received his B.A. at the University of Wisconsin–Madison in 1973. He did his M.A. at New York University in 1987 and finished his Ph.D. at NYU in 1992. He was the founding director of the A/P/A Studies Program and Institute at New York University. In 1979–1980, Tchen co-founded the Museum of Chinese in America and continues to serve as its senior advisor. In 2018, Tchen was named the Inaugural Clement A. Price Chair in Public History and the Humanities at Rutgers University and became Director of the Clement Price Institute on Ethnicity, Culture & the Modern Experience.

Tchen received the Charles S. Frankel Prize from the National Endowment for the Humanities(1991), and MLK Humanitarian Award from NYU (2012). His monograph, New York Before Chinatown, was the winner of the History/Social Science Book Award from the Association of Asian American Studies in 2001.

Tchen was featured in the film 9-Man and is a frequently called-upon expert on Chinatown and Asian American topics.

== Works ==
- Tchen, John Kuo Wei and Dylan Yeats (2014). Yellow Peril! An Archive of Anti-Asian Fear. New York: Verso.ISBN 9781781681237
- Tchen, John Kuo Wei (1999). New York Before Chinatown: Orientalism and the Shaping of American Culture, 1776-1882. Baltimore, MD: Johns Hopkins University Press. ISBN 9780801867941
- Genthe, Arnold and John Kuo Wei Tchen (1984). Genthe's Photographs of San Francisco's Old Chinatown. New York: Dover Publications. ISBN 9780486140698
