= Ursula Liang =

Asian American journalist and filmmaker

- Born: Alexandria, VA, U.S.
- Occupations: Filmmaker, Film and Television Producer, Story Consultant
- Notable work: 9-Man (film); Down a Dark Stairwell; Jeanette Lee Vs.

Ursula Liang is an American filmmaker, film and television producer, and story consultant known for her work in documentary cinema. Liang's career had its beginnings in journalism, transitioning into filmmaking with a focus on stories on social issues and marginalized communities.

== Early life and education ==
Liang was born in Alexandria, Virginia, and went to college at the University of Michigan, earning a degree in psychology and African-American studies. She also attended the historically black college, Spelman College, in 1994.

== Career ==
Liang started her career in journalism, contributing to a wide range of media. She held staff positions at The New York Times Op-Docs, T: The New York Times Style Magazine, ESPN The Magazine, and others.

Transitioning to filmmaking, Liang directed, produced, and shot the award-winning documentary 9-Man: A Streetball Battle in the Heart of Chinatown, a film that delves into a version of volleyball played in Chinatowns across North America. This debut feature was recognized for its insight into Chinatown's community and culture.

Liang continued to explore social narratives through her documentaries. Down a Dark Stairwell detailed the incident of a Chinese-American police officer's confrontation with an unarmed black man, exploring the debate over justice and systemic racism. Her most recent work, Jeanette Lee Vs., focuses on the life and impact of professional pool player Jeanette Lee.

In 2023, she came out with the film Two Strikes that aired on PBS Frontline. It examined Florida’s HB 1371, the Prisoner Release Reoffender Act, which was passed in May 1997, and the case of Mark Jones who was incarcerated and serving 12 years of a life sentence. The Florida law has been called "one of the strictest sentencing laws in the US," by the Tallahassee Democrat newspaper. The project was part of a fellowship she received from Frontline and Firelight Media, with support from The Marshall Project. It premiered at the Florida Film Festival in April 2023.

== Awards and recognition ==
In 2014, Liang received the Grand Jury Award of the Austin Asian American Film Festival;the Special Jury Award for Best Documentary Director, the Audience Award at the Los Angeles Asian Pacific Film Festival and the Audience Award at the Boston Asian American Film Festival. In 2015, she received the Documentary Feature Competition Winner, at the CAAMFest and the Directors' Choice Award at the Seattle Asian American Film Festival

In 2019, Her 9-Man film was cited inLos Angeles Times: “The 20 Best Asian American Films of the Last 20 Years” by Brian HU.

She received the 2022 Bronx Recognizes Its Own (BRIO) Award

Liang's is a recipient of the Chicken & Egg Award in 2024, acknowledging her impact and achievements in the field.

2024. Her film, Jeanette Lee VS. won the Women’s Image Award for Best Feature Length Documentary.

== Personal life ==
Liang has lived in the Bronx, New York and currently resides in Oakland, California.
