= North American Chinese Invitational Volleyball Tournament =

Chinese-American annual volleyball tournament

The North American Chinese Invitational Volleyball Tournament (N.A.C.I.V.T.) is held every Labor Day weekend and features men's nine-man (9-man) and women's 6's volleyball teams. The tournament is generally held outdoors and played on pavement, with the courts typically set-up in a large parking lot or even on the streets. Due to changes in weather the tournament can also be held indoors (e.g., convention centers). It is very much a cultural phenomenon; two-thirds of the players on each team must be 100% Chinese, and the rest must be of Asian descent (Asian: origins from: Myanmar (formerly Burma), Cambodia, China, Hong Kong, Indonesia, Japan, Korea, Laos, Malaysia, Mongolia, Philippines, Singapore, Taiwan, Thailand and Vietnam). The inaugural tournament was held in Boston in 1944. There are teams from Boston, Calgary, Edmonton, Maryland, Los Angeles, Chicago, North Carolina, Houston, Montreal, New York City, New Jersey, Ottawa, Philadelphia, San Francisco, Houston, San Diego, Toronto, Vancouver and Washington, D.C.

Each year there are also mini tournaments held in Toronto, Boston, New York City, Philadelphia, Washington, D.C./Maryland, Edmonton and San Francisco leading up to the annual NACIVT.

The men's 9-man portion of the NACIVT is the subject of a documentary called 9-Man that was completed in 2014 and had its world premiere at IFFBoston on April 27, 2014.

The record for the longest NACIVT set is between the Montreal Sunbirds and Chicago United 773 (39-37) and reffed by Calgary Dynasty in 2023, the old record being Washington CYC Freemasons against NY Rangers (37-35) in 2011.

== Champions ==
=== Men's NACIVT Champions ===
Year	Annual	Location	Champions	Finalist
2026	81st	Montreal	(United States) San Francisco Digma Left (左)	(United States) San Francisco Tien Lung Dragons - West Coast
2025	80th	New York	(United States) Washington D.C. CYC Juniors	(United States) San Francisco Tien Lung Dragons
2024	79th	San Francisco	(Canada) Toronto Connex A	(United States) San Francisco Sky
2023	78th	Baltimore (hosted by Wash DC)	(United States) San Francisco Paai Kau Smash	(Canada) Toronto Qilin
2022	77th	Providence (hosted by Boston)	(United States) San Francisco Tien Lung Dragon Fire	(Canada) Toronto Connex A
2021	76th	Hosted by SF-*No Canada Teams	(United States) San Francisco Paai Kau Smash*	(United States) San Francisco Xiao Long Pow*
2020	N/A	Baltimore (hosted by Wash DC)	Cancelled due to COVID Pandemic	Cancelled due to COVID Pandemic
2019	75th	Toronto	(Canada) Toronto Connex A	(United States) San Francisco Paai Kau Smash
2018	74th	Montreal	(United States) San Francisco Paai Kau Smash	(Canada) Toronto Connex A
2017	73rd	Fort Lauderdale (hosted by Boston)	(United States) San Francisco Paai Kau Smash	(Canada) Toronto Connex A
2016	72nd	Los Angeles	(United States) San Francisco Paai Kau Smash	(Canada) Toronto Connex A
2015	71st	New York	(Canada) Toronto Connex A	(Canada) Toronto Zhen Qi Black
2014	70th	Las Vegas (hosted by SF)	(Canada) Toronto Connex A	(United States) Washington D.C. CYC A
2013	69th	Washington	(United States) San Francisco Paai Kau Smash	(Canada) Toronto Ngun Lam Red
2012	68th	Toronto	(Canada) Toronto Connex A	(United States) San Francisco Paai Kau Smash
2011	67th	Montreal	(United States) San Francisco Westcoast	(United States) Los Angeles Midwest Mad Dogs
2010	66th	Boston	(United States) San Francisco Westcoast	(Canada) Toronto Connex A
2009	65th	Los Angeles	(United States) San Francisco Westcoast	(United States) Washington D.C. CYC A
2008	64th	New York	(Canada) Toronto Connex A	(United States) Washington D.C. MVP/SixPak A
2007	63rd	San Francisco	(United States) Washington D.C. MVP/SixPak A	(Canada) Toronto Connex A
2006	62nd	Washington D.C.	(United States) San Francisco Westcoast	(United States) Washington D.C. MVP/SixPak A
2005	61st	Toronto	(Canada) Toronto Connex A	(United States) Los Angeles Midwest Mad Dogs
2004	60th	Boston	(Canada) Toronto Connex A	(United States) Washington D.C. Hip Sing/MVP/Sixpak A
2003	59th	New York	(Canada) Toronto Connex A	(United States) Washington D.C. Hip Sing/MVP/Sixpak A
2002	58th	San Francisco	(Canada) Toronto Connex A	(United States) Washington D.C. Hip Sing/MVP/Sixpak A
2001	57th	Washington D.C.	(Canada) Toronto Connex A	(United States) Washington D.C. Hip Sing/MVP/Sixpak A
2000	56th	Toronto	(Canada) Toronto Connex A	(United States) Washington D.C. Hip Sing/MVP/Sixpak A
1999	55th	Boston	(Canada) Toronto Connex A	(United States) Boston Knights A
1998	54th	Montreal	(Canada) Toronto Connex A	(United States) Washington D.C. Hip Sing/MVP/Sixpak A
1997	53rd	New York	(Canada) Toronto Connex A	(Canada) Toronto Ngun Lam
1996	52nd	San Francisco	(Canada) Toronto Connex A	(Canada) Toronto Ngun Lam
1995	51st	Washington D.C.	(United States) San Francisco Mei Mei	(Canada) Toronto Ngun Lam
1994	50th	Boston	(United States) San Francisco Mei Mei	(Canada) Toronto Connex A
1993	49th	Toronto	(United States) San Francisco Mei Mei	(Canada) Toronto Connex A
1992	48th	Montreal	(United States) San Francisco Mei Mei	(Canada) Toronto Ngun Lam
1991	47th	New York	(Canada) Toronto Ngun Lam	(United States) San Francisco Mei Mei
1990	46th	San Francisco	(Canada) Toronto Ngun Lam	(United States) New York Vikings Gold
1989	45th	Washington	(Canada) Toronto Ngun Lam
1988	44th	Toronto	(Canada) Toronto Ngun Lam
1987	43rd	Boston	(Canada) Toronto Ngun Lam	(Canada) Montreal Hung Ying
1986	42nd	Montreal	(Canada) Toronto Ngun Lam
1985	41st	New York	(Canada) Toronto Flying Tigers	(United States) San Francisco Mei Yi Mei
1984	40th	San Francisco	(Canada) Toronto Ngun Lam
1983	39th	Washington D.C.	(United States) San Francisco Chung Sing
1982	38th	Toronto	(Canada) Toronto Flying Tigers A	(United States) San Francisco Chung Sing
1981	37th	Boston	(Canada) Toronto Flying Tigers A
1980	36th	New York	(United States) San Francisco Chung Sing
1979	35th	San Francisco	(United States) San Francisco Chung Sing	(United States) San Francisco Mei Yi Mei
1978	34th	Washington D.C.	(United States) San Francisco Chung Sing
1977	33rd	Toronto	(United States) San Francisco Chung Sing
1976	32nd	Boston	(United States) New York Free Mason
1975	31st	New York	(United States) Washington D.C. CYC A	(United States) New York Free Mason
1974	30th	San Francisco	(United States) San Francisco Chung Sing
1973	29th	Washington D.C.	(United States) San Francisco Wor Mei	(United States) San Francisco Chung Sing
1972	28th	Boston	(United States) Washington D.C. CYC A	(United States) Boston Knights A
1971	27th	New York	(United States) San Francisco Chung Sing
1970	26th	Washington D.C.	(United States) Boston Chun Lin
1969	25th	Boston	(United States) New York Free Mason
1968	24th	New York	(United States) Boston Knights
1967	23rd	Washington D.C.	(United States) New York Vikings
1966	22nd	Chicago	(United States) New York Free Mason
1965	21st	Boston	(United States) Boston Vikings
1964	20th	New York	(United States) New York Wah Hung
1963	19th	Washington D.C.	(United States) New York Vikings
1962	18th	Boston	(United States) Los Angeles Hung Fung
1961	17th	New York	(United States) New York Vikings
1960	16th	Washington D.C.	(United States) New York Vikings
1959	15th	Boston	(United States) San Francisco Kong Fung
1958	14th	New York	(United States) New York Hung Fung
1957	13th	Washington D.C.	(United States) New York Lum Ying
1956	12th	Boston
1955	11th	New York
1954	10th	Washington D.C.
1953	9th	Boston
1952	8th	New York
1951	7th	Washington D.C.	(United States) New York Poy-Ting
1950	6th	Boston
1949	5th	New York
1948	4th	Washington D.C.
1947	3rd	Boston
1946	2nd	New York
1945	1st	Boston

=== Women's NACIVT Champions ===
Year	Annual	Location	Champions	Finalist
2026	81st	Montreal	(United States) San Francisco Wave	(Canada) Toronto Connex A
2025	80th	New York	(United States) Philadelphia CIA Women	(Canada) Toronto Connex A
2024	79th	San Francisco	(Canada) Toronto Storm X	(United States) San Francisco AIM
2023	78th	Baltimore (Hosted by Wash DC)	(United States) San Francisco AIM	(Canada) Toronto Connex A
2022	77th	Providence (Hosted by Boston)	(Canada) Toronto Connex A	(United States) Los Angeles IVBall
2021	76th	Oakland (Hosted by SF-*No Canada Teams)	(United States) San Francisco AIM*	(United States) Los Angeles IVBall*
2020	N/A	Baltimore (hosted by Wash DC)	Cancelled due to COVID Pandemic	Cancelled due to COVID Pandemic
2019	75th	Toronto	(Canada) Toronto Connex A	(United States) Los Angeles IVBall
2018	74th	Montreal	(United States) Los Angeles Raki	(United States) San Francisco Tien Lung Dragon Ice
2017	73rd	Fort Lauderdale (hosted by Boston)	(United States) Los Angeles Green	(United States) San Francisco Tien Lung Dragon Ice
2016	72nd	Los Angeles	(United States) Los Angeles Green	(United States) San Francisco Tien Lung Dragon Ice
2015	71st	New York	(United States) San Francisco Tien Lung Dragon Ice	(United States) San Francisco AIM
2014	70th	Las Vegas (hosted by SF)	(Canada) Toronto Connex A	(United States) Los Angeles iVball
2013	69th	Washington	(United States) Los Angeles iVball	(Canada) Toronto Connex A
2012	68th	Toronto	(Canada) Toronto Connex A	(United States) Los Angeles iVball
2011	67th	Montreal	(Canada) Toronto Connex A	(United States) San Francisco AIM
2010	66th	Boston	(United States) New York Strangers	(United States) Washington D.C. Slackers
2009	65th	Los Angeles	(Canada) Toronto Connex A	(United States) New York Strangers
2008	64th	New York	(United States) New York MIG	(United States) San Francisco AIM
2007	63rd	San Francisco	(United States) San Diego iVball	(United States) San Francisco AIM
2006	62nd	Washington D.C.	(United States) Washington D.C. Slackers
2005	61st	Toronto	(Canada) Toronto Connex A	(Canada) Toronto Flying Tigers
2004	60th	Boston	(United States) San Francisco AIM
2003	59th	New York	(Canada) Toronto Flying Tigers A
2002	58th	San Francisco	(Canada) Toronto Flying Tigers A	(United States) SF Just for Fun/AsianAvenue.com
2001	57th	Washington D.C.	(United States) SF Just for Fun/AsianAvenue.com
2000	56th	Toronto	(Canada) Toronto Flying Tigers A
1999	55th	Boston	(United States) SF Just for Fun/AsianAvenue.com
1998	54th	Montreal	(Canada) Toronto Flying Tigers A
1997	53rd	New York	(United States) New York New York
1996	52nd	San Francisco	(United States) San Francisco Divas
1995	51st	Washington D.C.	(United States) San Francisco Vector
1994	50th	Boston	(United States) San Francisco Just Volleyball	(Canada) Montreal Free Mason
1993	49th	Toronto	(United States) San Francisco Just Volleyball
1992	48th	Montreal	(United States) San Francisco Just Volleyball
1991	47th	New York	(United States) New York Vikings Won Fung Red	(United States) San Francisco Just Volleyball
1990	46th	San Francisco	(United States) San Francisco Just Volleyball	(United States) New York Vikings Won Fung Red
1989	45th	Washington	(United States) New York Vikings Won Fung Red	(United States) San Francisco Just Volleyball
1988	44th	Toronto	(United States) New York Vikings Won Fung Red	(United States) San Francisco Just Volleyball
1987	43rd	Boston	(United States) San Francisco Just Volleyball	(United States) California Cave
1986	42nd	Montreal	(United States) San Francisco Just Volleyball
1985	41st	New York	(United States) San Francisco Just Volleyball
1984	40th	San Francisco	(United States) San Francisco Mei Mei
1983	39th	Washington D.C.	(United States) San Francisco New Horizon
1982	38th	Toronto	(United States) San Francisco Reggie's Angels
1981	37th	Boston	(United States) San Francisco Reggie's Angels
1980	36th	New York	(United States) San Francisco Reggie's Angels
1979	35th	San Francisco	(United States) San Francisco Chung Sing
1978	34th	Washington D.C.	(United States) San Francisco Chung Sing
1977	33rd	Toronto	(United States) New York Skylarks

== See also ==
- 9-man
- Nine-man Volleyball
