= Vertical patrol =

Vertical patrol is a form of patrol involving posting officers on different floors in buildings simultaneously.

This technique is known to be used by:

- Chicago Housing Authority Police Department (defunct)
- New York City Police Department Housing Bureau

== See also ==
- Shooting of Akai Gurley
