= Mountain Brothers =

American hip hop group

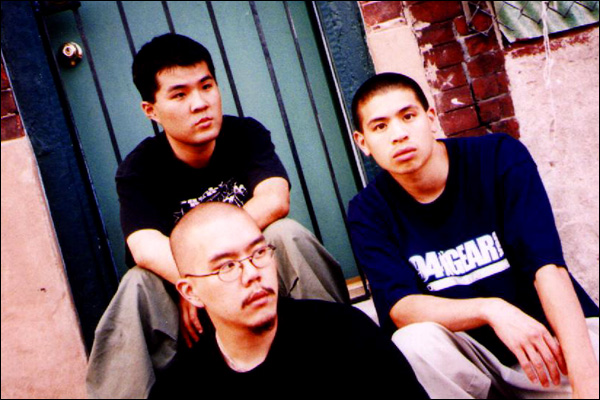
- The Mountain Brothers, from top to bottom: Styles, Peril-L, CHOPS

Background information
- Origin: Philadelphia, Pennsylvania, U.S.
- Genre: Hip hop
- Years active: 1993–2003, 2013
- Labels: Ruffhouse Records (U.S.); Pimpstrut Records (U.S.); Babygrande Records (U.S.)
- Members: CHOPS (Scott Jung); Peril-L (Christopher Wang); Styles (Steve Wei)

Mountain Brothers was an American hip hop group originally from Philadelphia, Pennsylvania. Named after the legend of 108 mountain bandits depicted in the Chinese novel Water Margin, Mountain Brothers are considered cultural pioneers, being one of the first Asian American hip-hop groups and also for the lack of sampling of other music in construction of their own. Mountain Brothers released two critically acclaimed albums, Self Vol 1 and Triple Crown, the first of which is widely considered to be an independent hip-hop classic. Some of their more notable songs included "Paperchase," "Galaxies (The Next Level)," and "Thoroughbred." The last of the three is featured in remixed form on CHOPS' album Virtuosity. They produced national radio and TV commercials for Sprite on the ad "Rhymes from The Mind" and Nike on the ad "Players Delight". They also produced a music video for "Galaxies (The Next Level)". Styles Infinite also released two 12" singles, "Fresh Air/Aquarian Mind" and "Easy on the Ears/Finishline".

== Career ==
The group formed in 1994 after all attended the Pennsylvania State University in State College, Pennsylvania. They shared a common interest; making music which is how they became friends. There was an electronic music lab at Penn State which they took advantage of by using it as their recording studio. Mountain Brothers' goal was to get signed to a major label so their music could be known nationwide. Their method was to send their demos to a variety of music labels; somewhat anonymously. Chops stated, “We didn’t want people to prejudge based on us being Asian so we would send a demo and a letter saying, ‘We have a picture, but it doesn’t matter what we look like if you don’t like our music.’ People that knew music, it was their job to like music, so they loved our music and then we sent them our picture; their mind was blown!”

The group became the first Chinese-American rap group to sign with a major music label when they signed with Ruffhouse Records in 1996. Ruffhouse released them in 1998 after only releasing a promotional single.

The group disbanded in 2003 shortly after the release of the album Triple Crown. CHOPS is the only member still active in hip-hop, working with artists such as Kanye West, Chamillionaire, Bahamadia, Planet Asia, and Paul Wall. He also provided music for the MTV reality television show Rob and Big, the soundtrack for the independent film Dark, and contributed music to the soundtracks for the films Brown Sugar and House of Wax. Peril-L is currently a medical researcher and collector of vintage furniture and Styles Infinite is a doctor. In June 2012, they reunited and recorded new material for a compilation by CHOPS. They released the music video for their song "Keep On" on September 25, 2013.

== Members ==
- CHOPS (Scott Jung)
- Peril-L (Christopher Wang)
- Styles Infinite (Stephen/Steve Wei)

Additional band members performed with Mountain Brothers during certain live performances, including

- DJ Roli Rho from 5th Platoon
- The Black Republicans

== Discography ==
=== Albums ===
- Self: Volume 1 (1999) (Pimpstrut Records (self-released))
- Triple Crown (2003) (Babygrande)
- Self: Volume 1.5 (2019) (re-release for streaming sites)

=== EPs ===
- Microphone Phenomenal (2002) (Babygrande)
