= Volleyball variations =

Sports related to volleyball

Several sports related to volleyball have become popular. Indoor volleyball and beach volleyball are both events at the Olympics, and sitting volleyball is an event at the Paralympics. Other varieties are localized, or are played at an amateur or informal level.

== Aquatic volleyball ==
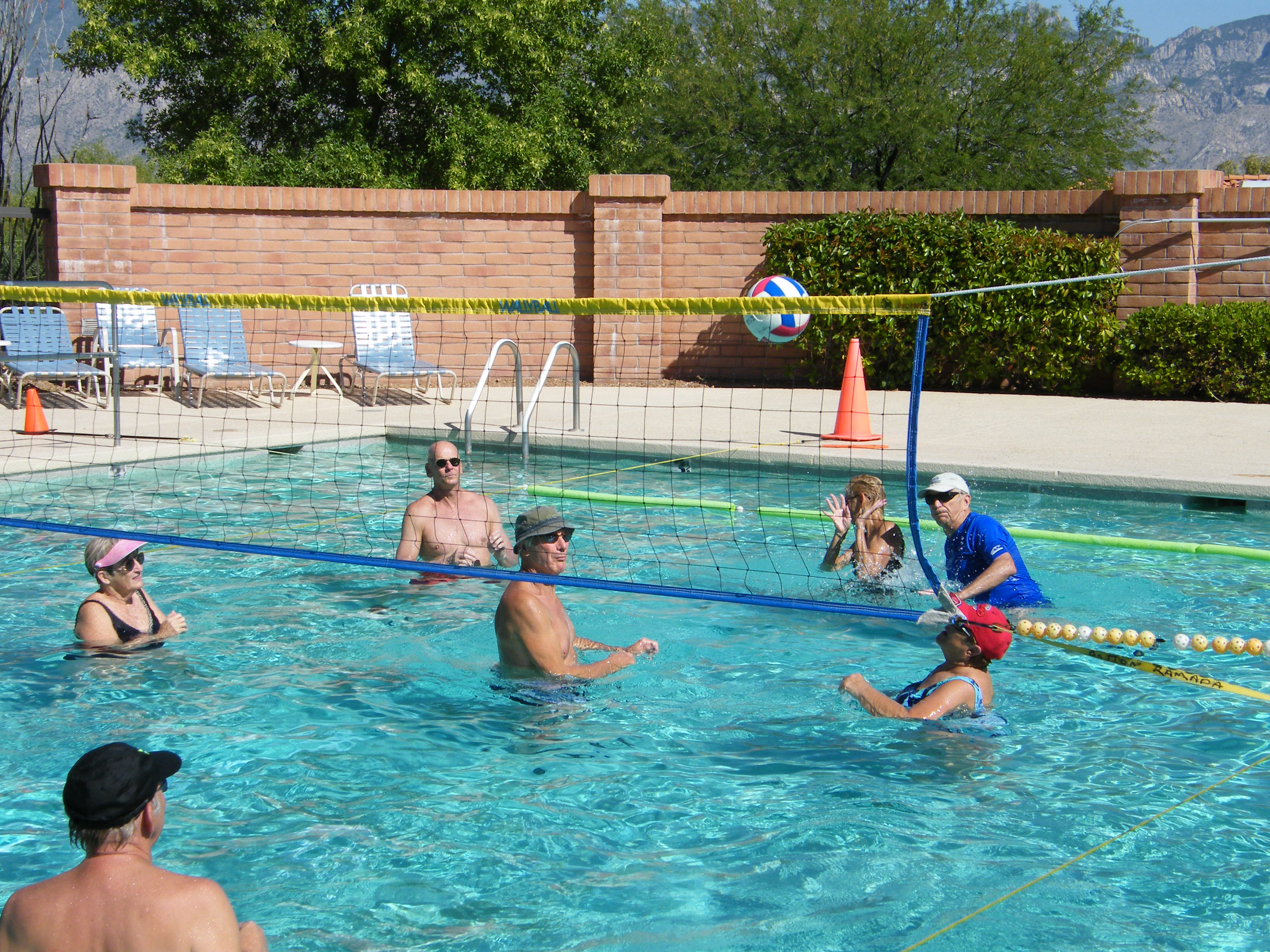
Aquatic volleyball

Biribol was the first aquatic variant of volleyball. It was invented in the '60s in Birigui, Brazil, and has moderate popularity in the country.

Aquatic volleyball is a team sport similar to volleyball but adapted for competition in a deep swimming pool. It is also referred to as "pool volleyball", and sometimes as "aqua polo", not to be confused with water polo. Players must change sides after each round for it to be fair. Each round is up to 15 points, however, you need to win by two points. If the ball hits the edge of the pool but bounces back in, that is fair. If the ball hits the edge of the pool and bounces out, that is not fair.

=== Beach aquatic volleyball ===
Beach aquatic volleyball is an individual or team sport similar to aquatic volleyball adapted for play in the shallow water of a beach.

== Beach volleyball ==
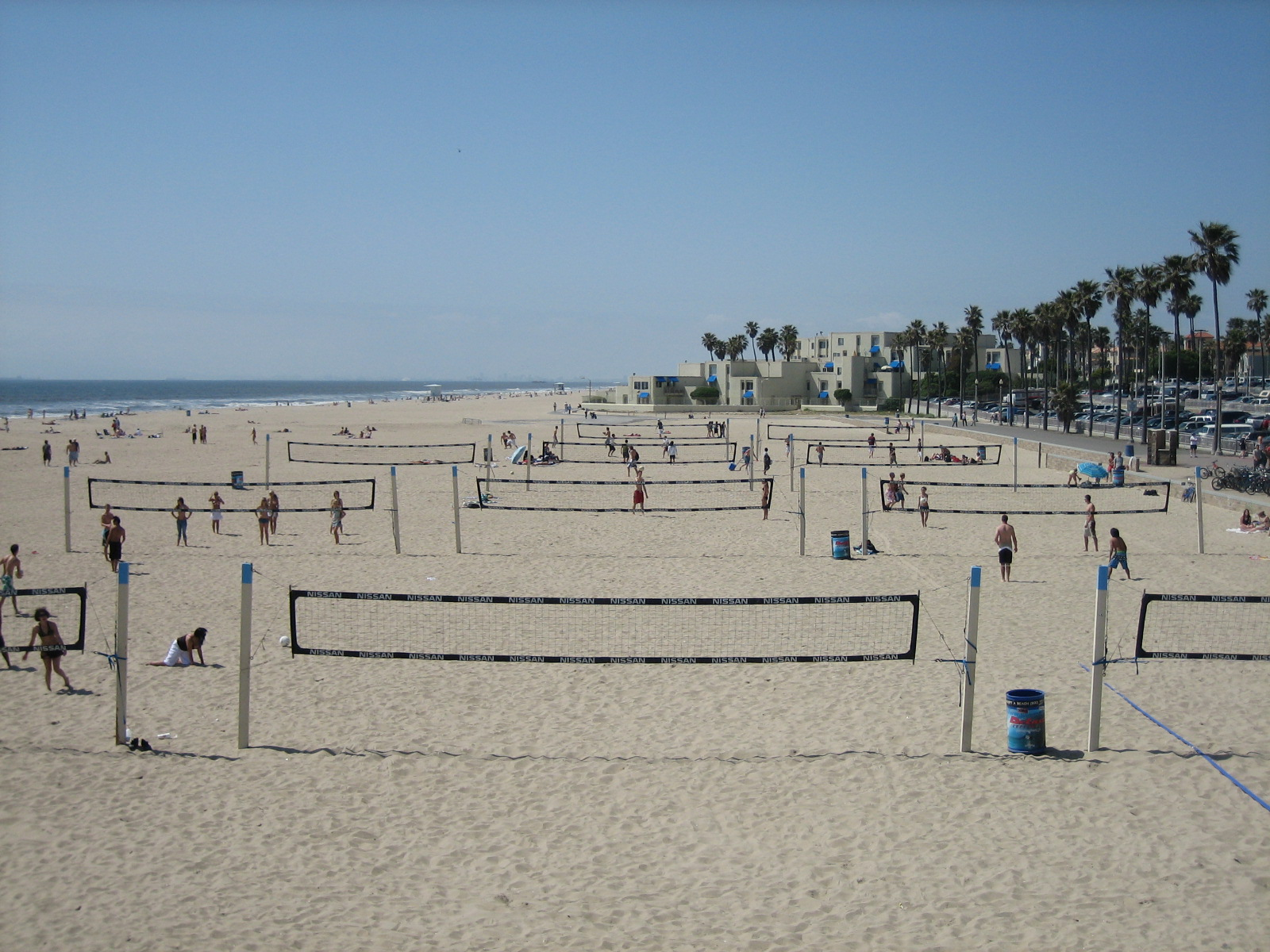
Rows of beach volleyball nets in Huntington Beach, California.

A variation of the game rivaling the original sport of volleyball in popularity, beach volleyball evolved from the recreational games of volleyball played on many beaches around the world. It became an official Olympic sport in 1996. This version, rather than being played on indoor hard courts, is played on sand courts which may either be formed naturally or built specifically for the purpose. Instead of a team of six, each team consists of only two players. There are some instances where more than 2 can play together. The rules are almost identical with some exceptions including:

- The size of the court (16m x 8m)
- The block counts as the first contact
- The banning of the open-hand dink or dump plays where a player uses his or her finger tips to redirect the ball into the opponent's court instead of a hard spike. A dink may be performed with a closed hand or knuckle
- Stricter rules around double-contacts during hand setting
- The time limit for serve is five seconds
- Games are usually played to 21 points, rather than 25 as common in indoor volleyball. The first team to win two sets wins the match. If a third deciding set is required, it is played to 15.

=== Indoor sand volleyball ===
This is a newer variation of beach volleyball. As beach volleyball took volleyball outdoors, indoor sand volleyball takes beach volleyball indoors. In the United States, a growing number of colleges are now considering switching from hard court indoor volleyball to sand court indoor volleyball. The biggest reason for the possible change is the reduced rate of injury of players. Secondary reasons are: 1) bad weather doesn't cancel play, something that commonly happens with beach volleyball; 2) it is thought to make the game more appealing to spectators since sand courts do not require players to wear knee pads or shoes.

Indoor sand volleyball teams vary from two to six members, college teams having six. Normally, rather than using a purpose-built hall, an indoor basketball court is converted. A protective tarpaulin covers the floor of the basketball court and "soft" sand is laid a foot deep over it. The boundaries are commonly marked off with lines in the sand. However, a recent innovation uses colored lasers that illuminate the lines in the sand.

In some venues, there exist sand courts that are used as usual during the spring, summer, and fall months, but during the winter months, a large tent (usually dome-shaped) is erected over the courts.

== Snow volleyball ==
Snow volleyball is a variant of beach volleyball that is played on snow. The rules are similar to the beach game, with the main differences being the scoring system (best of 3 sets played to 15 points) and the number of players (three starters and one substitute).

== Crossnet ==
Hybrid sport of volleyball and four square. Can be played with 4 players or 8 players (2v2v2v2).

== Ecua-volley ==
Ecua-volley is a variant of volleyball invented and played in Ecuador. Differences include a higher net (2.8 meters tall) and the use of a soccer ball. It is very popular among people that live in the USA. Each court side measures 9x9 meters. There are 3 players on each side known as the spiker, the setter, and the flyer (libero). Since the ball is heavier than an American volleyball, players are allowed to slightly grab the ball however, the grab must be quick (less than 1 second). Matches are typically played up to 15, 12, or 10 points depending on what is agreed upon. No player is allowed to touch the net, the poles or pass the dividing line separating the two opposite court sides. Upon doing so is considered a point or change serve for the opposing team. Points are made on a serve only manner (meaning only the side that serves the ball can make a point, otherwise it is a change serve for the opposing team). Other rules apply as well but the rest of the game is played as your typical American volleyball.

== Hooverball ==
Popularized by President Herbert Hoover, Hooverball is played with a volleyball net and a medicine ball; it is scored like tennis, but the ball is caught and then thrown back. The weight of the medicine ball can make the sport to be quite physically demanding; annual championship tournaments are held annually in West Branch, Iowa.

== Informal variations ==
There are a number of volleyball variations that do not have a standardized set of rules. Mud volleyball, played in mud pits, is one. Mud volleyball tournaments are often organized as fundraisers.

== Jollyball ==
Jollyball is a cross between juggling and volleyball. A juggling ball is passed between players who must catch it by using the ball, plus the two that they are holding, to perform a juggling pattern.

== Mixed teams ==
Most competitive volleyball is played with same-sex teams (exclusively so at the elite levels, although the International Volleyball Association ran a professional co-ed league in the 1970s). Different sets of rules have been drafted to allow for mixed teams, often known as "coed" teams in the United States. The net is at men's height for "regular coed" and women's height for "reverse coed". Several adaptations are common, some of them to compensate for the men's greater reach and strength. The FIVB rules used internationally do not support mixed play, but USA Volleyball, the national governing body for the United States, publishes specific rules for indoor 6-person teams, the main points of which are:

- Three males and three females must be in alternating positions, and each team's roster may include 2 liberos.
- In reverse coed males may only attack a ball above the height of the net if the ball has an upward trajectory immediately after contact. Note that the serve is not an attack and thus has no such restriction. Males are not allowed to block. When there is only one front row-female player, one back-row female may block provided the other back-row female is outside the attack zone. If the ball is touched more than once on one side then a male must make one of the contacts. Strategically, this usually means that a male setter is used.
- In regular coed, when there is only one front-row male player then one back-row male may block provided the other back-row male is outside the attack zone. If the ball is touched more than once on one side then a female player must make one of the contacts. Female players have no blocking or attacking restrictions. Strategically, this usually means that a female setter is used.

USA Volleyball publishes similar mixed team rules for outdoor (beach and grass) volleyball, with the exception that attacks from male players are not required to have an upward trajectory if the attacker's last contact with the ground was outside of the attack zone.

== Newcomb ball ==
A simplified form used to teach the fundamentals of volleyball, Newcomb (occasionally referred to as "Nuke 'em") is generally taught to school-aged children but is also popular among adults of limited athletic ability. Its main differences from regular volleyball are that the ball can be caught before passing on to a team-mate or over the net, and each pass or serve is a throw rather than a hit. While most other volleyball rules apply, variations on the numbers of players per team and the numbers of 'catches' per side are common, and players holding the ball are sometimes allowed a limited number of steps.

Newcomb (or Newcomb Ball) was invented in 1895 by Clara Gregory Baer, a physical education instructor at Newcomb College in Louisiana.

Volleyball was independently invented in the same year. Newcomb was a popular competitive sport in the early 1900s, but it is now seen as a variation of volleyball and is played mostly by school children.

Newcomb can be also played in a way similar to dodgeball. The main and only difference in the less played version is that instead of scoring points, a teammate is eliminated if he or she makes a mistake. The game continues until all of the players on one team are eliminated.

== Nine-man volleyball ==
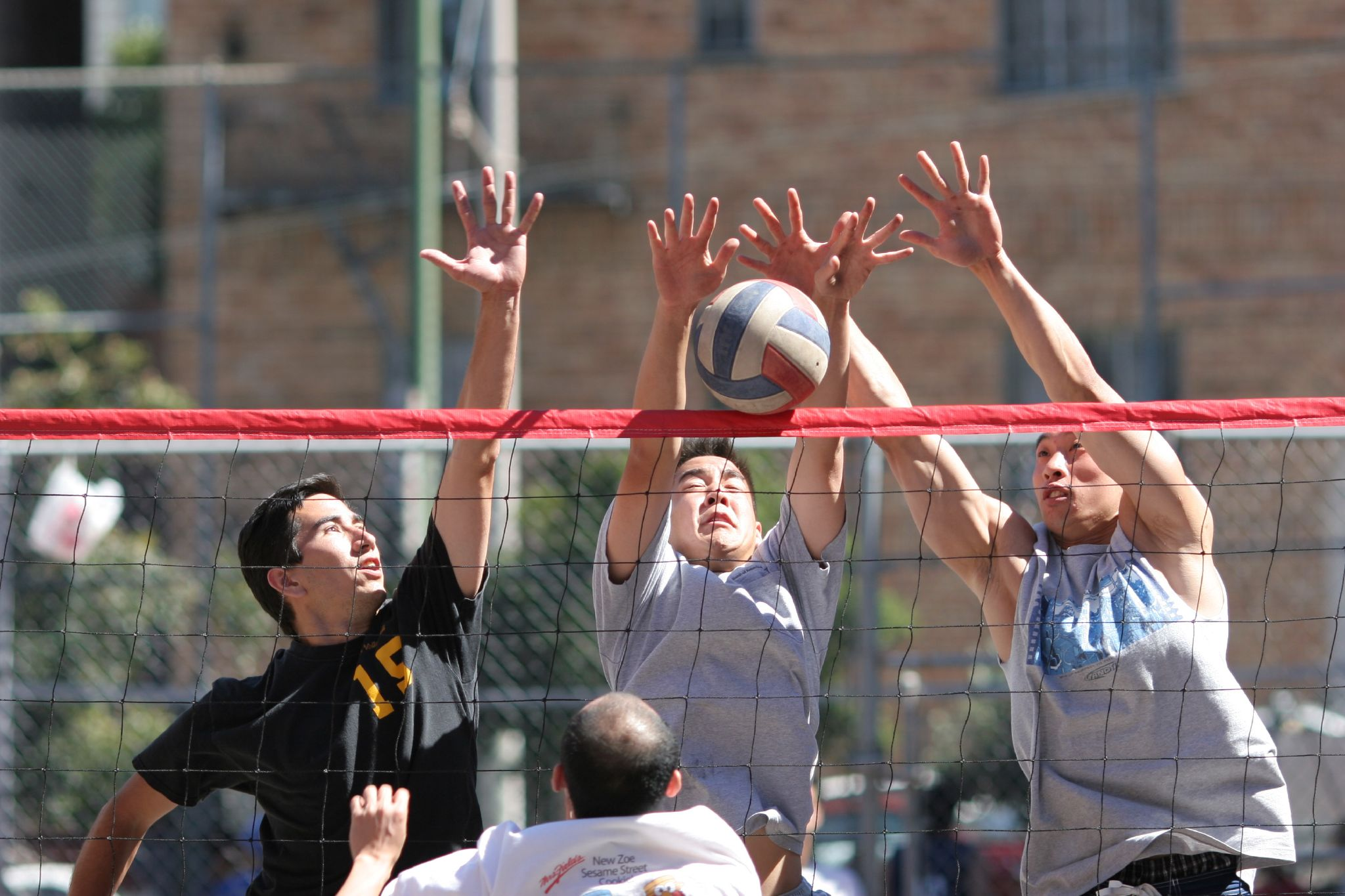
A triple block in a game of nine-man volleyball

Nine-man volleyball is a variation of volleyball utilizing nine players and a slightly larger court (10 by 20 m [33 by 66 ft]) originated in Asia in the 1920s when American missionaries introduced the game in China. The birthplace of 9man can be speculated to be the city of Tai-Shan, China where 9man tournaments are played regularly, sometimes even for prize money. 9man is also played for recreation in South Korea.

The variant became popular within the Chinese-American communities community in New York City and spread to Chinatowns other large US and Canadian cities. The North American version of 9man volleyball continues to grow with a rotating popular tournament called the North American Chinese Invitational Volleyball Tournament. It was played in the Asian Games in 1958 and in 1962.

Aside from the larger court and additional players, rule differences for 9man volleyball in Asia and of those used in the NACIVT differ.

The major rule differences from indoor volleyball and NACIVT 9man rules include (Those rules in italics only apply within NACIVT rules):

- A lower net (235 cm (93 in) rather than 243 cm (96 in)).
- Players don't rotate--front players stay in front (and thus never serve), and back players in back.
- If the ball touches the net between two contacts by the same team, those two contacts only count as one of the three allowed before the ball must be sent over the net. The same player may legally make both contacts.
- It is permitted to briefly carry the ball during a spiking motion.
- Players may not penetrate the plane of the net while blocking.
- If a player touches the ball while blocking, it counts as one of the three allowed contacts.
- Jump serving is illegal.
- It is illegal to touch the ball with any body part besides the hands and arms.
- A served ball which hits the top of the net and falls inside the boundaries of the opponents' court entitles the server to a second chance (like tennis).
- There is no "ten foot line": any player may attack the ball from anywhere on the court.

9 man rules used in Asia are slightly different:

- Players do not rotate, however every player on the court must serve at some point.
- Carrying or lifts are not legal.
- Players may penetrate the plane of the net when blocking.
- Jump-serving is legal.

In South Korea, nine-man volleyball is popular as a recreation. But those who plays it are not used to the detailed rule of the game because they generally watch only 6-man volleyball (standard volleyball) on TV or somewhere else. So the rule generally played tends to be the mixture of the original 9-man volleyball and standard volleyball.

== Pioneerball ==
Pioneerball - a game with a ball, similar in its rules to volleyball. Originated in the USSR in the 1930s. The name of the game comes from the fact that it's a game with a ball and was played by pioneers.

The game is played with a volleyball on the volleyball court. Each team has from 3 to 8 players. The court is conventionally divided by the number of players into 6 - 7 zones. The first player throws the ball from the far edge of his half of the court over the net to the half of the court of the opposing team. One of the players who catch the ball can make no more than three steps on their half of the court, throw it back over the net to the half of the court of the first team. One of the first team's players also has to catch the ball and make no more than three steps, throw it to the half of the court of the opposing team. And so on until the ball hits the ground, then the team which threw the ball last scores one point. In this game, like in volleyball, players move around the court to the next area in a clockwise direction after winning the ball service. After 15 points, the teams change sides of the field, and play the second set. If the result of the two sets is 1-1, the third set is assigned. And also if the ball hits the net, the score is not counted. The rules of this game are neither officially approved nor recorded, so they may differ slightly from the place to place.

=== Pioneerball with two balls ===
It is played by two teams of six to eight players in each squad. The total number of players is 12-16 players. The player of the first team gets one ball, and the player of the second team gets the second ball. They are located at the corners - each on his half of the court, and prepare for the ball service (throwing the ball to the opponent's half of the court) at the referee's whistle. After the whistle the task of each team is to avoid both two balls to be simultaneously situated on their side of the court, if both balls simultaneously touch the hands of the players or land on their side of the court, the opposing team scores a point. The rest of the rules are similar to the basic version of pioneerball. There is also a variation of pioneerball for blind children.

== Shooting volleyball ==
In shooting volleyball the team consists of normally seven players. Three players play at the back side, three players play center of the court, and one player stands in front of the net. Any ball that goes to into the net is to be out by the player who is standing in front of it, also known as the net man. Some players also smash the ball with high vertical leaps like Olympic volleyball but there is no setter in team. In this game, the players hit the ball with both hands by punching it with both hands. They try to hit as fast as they can in order to force a mistake from opponent players and try to get rebound as a set ball for any player to smash it with jump, using one hand and if the player standing under the net misses the ball than defender tries to take the ball using the under hand and give maximum height to it. When one player smashes the ball with great skill the spectators give prize money to that player and the game has to stop at that time.

Shooting volleyball court is 35 ft (11 m) and 70 ft (21 m) in length. Net height was 8 ft (2.4 m) before some years but nowadays the net height is 7.2 to 7.5 ft (2.2 to 2.3 m). The ball size is same to handball. Shooting volleyball is popular in Pakistan (Punjab) (Sindh) (Bloachistan) (KPK), USA and India, especially North Indian States. Most of the above-mentioned rules are not valid at present in shooting volleyball (Pakistan). For example: The height of net has been reduced to 6 ft (1.8 m). Nowadays eight players can play in a team four players play at back side and four at the center of court and one player stands in front of net. If any ball goes into net (called as third ball or 'common ball'), the net man pushes it back to his team and the 'Defencer' (man which is standing in the right center) pushes it towards the back side players (3rd players) of the opponent team. And the players of third hit it forcefully.

== Short court ==
Short court volleyball can be played with 2 to 8 people. The back line is normally 10 feet (3 meters) from the net with normal side lines. The back line could be even shorter if there are only two players per side. All normal volleyball contacts are legal in this game. Jumping to tip and block is also legal as well. There is no official scoring number in this game; winning score can be determined by players before starting the game.

== Sitting volleyball ==
Sitting volleyball for locomotor-disabled individuals was first introduced in 1956 by the Dutch Sports Committee. International competition began in 1967, but it would be 1978 before the International Sports Organisation for the Disabled (ISOD) sanctioned the sport and sponsored an official international tournament in 1979 at Haarlem, Netherlands.

The game is played on a smaller 10 m × 6 m (33 ft × 20 ft) court and with a 0.8 m (2 ft 7 in) wide net set to a height of 1.15 m (3 ft 9 in) for men and 1.05 m (3 ft 5 in) for women. When hitting or attacking the ball, the player must have one "buttock" or an extension of the torso still in contact with the floor. Traditionally the sport has been played not only by amputees and people with polio, but people who have orthopedic problems in their knees or ankles. Often players with no sitting volleyball classification also participate. Because of the game's quick pace and the use of hands to move towards and play the ball, good balance and a sturdy bottom are a necessity. Consequently, it is not the ideal sport for most paraplegics.

Men's sitting volleyball was introduced to the Paralympic Games in 1980 and has grown to be one of the more popular Paralympic sports due to the fast and exciting action. Women's sitting volleyball was added to the program for the 2004 Summer Paralympics. The international governing body for the sport is The World Organisation Volleyball for Disabled (WOVD). The WOVD was founded in 1980 in the Netherlands, by the Dutchman Pieter Joon.

== Soft volleyball ==
Soft volleyball is played using a larger rubber volleyball, which is designed to absorb initial impact on the arms. Ideally this type of volleyball is used to introduce the game to first time players and adolescents, with a focus on control, fundamentals of the game and just having fun. The Soft Volleyball is commonly used in Japanese elementary and junior high schools for the very purpose mentioned above. A usual game of Soft Volleyball has four people per side rather than six.

== Traditional volleyball ==
Traditional volleyball has its roots in East Africa, India, and Pakistan. The game is usually played within the Ithna Ashari, Ismaili, Bohra, Kokni, Punjabi, Rajput Dhobi, Lohana, Waniya, Kutchi, Memon and other Asian communities worldwide.

Traditional volleyball varies from indoor gymnasium play, outdoor play on sand, grass, or clay - as well as street volleyball for recreation.

There is a three-touch system like International volleyball, however, traditional volleyball does not require the bump-set-spike scenario. Instead, traditional volleyball is based on a consistent volley of the ball - only the serving side can score - and players play a style which is considered "closed hand/fist" play. The game can be played with up to nine participants per side (similar to Asian nine-man volleyball, but with variations to the game), or as little as five.

There is no rotation in traditional volleyball, however, in certain East Indian and Southeast Asian communities, they do allow rotating as the rules tend to vary from team to team. The court can vary from 30 feet x 30 feet to as large as 35 feet x by 35 feet.

There are several traditional volleyball teams centered in Eastern Canada. This includes Toronto North, Toronto Jaffery's O.G., Toronto Jaffery's 2.0, RK's Golden Eagles, Toronto Warriors, United Stars A, United Stars B, Ottawa and many more.

Western Canada is also home to several teams, including Van City, Edmonton, and Calgary. The U.S. boasts a number of teams that practice on a weekly basis, including Albuquerque, Allentown Challengers, Allentown Defenders, Dallas, Houston, Houston Haidari, Minnesota Jaffery, New York Union, Orlando Union A, Orlando Union B, and other cities.

There is a large number of teams in the UK as well with several tournaments each year. UK teams include Stanmore Jaffery's, Birmingham Stars, Preston Simba, Leicester, London, SRDS, and dozens more.

The former champions of East Africa are Vyamshala Volleyball Team from Dar es Salaam, Tanzania. The current reigning, defending champions of the Annual Unity Games hosted in Dubai, UAE are Morogoro Jafferies. Evening Stars Red from Dar Es Salaam are the current East Africa Champions winning a huge tournament recently held in Nairobi, Kenya from April 3 - 5, 2026.

The weight of the ball varies as well. In North America, they play with a lighter ball, around 10.5 to 11 lb (4.8 to 5.0 kg). of pressure. However, in East Africa, India, and Pakistan, the game is played with a heavier ball, anywhere from 12 to 14 lb (5.4 to 6.4 kg) of pressure.

Some of the key positions on the team are Net Center (or nettie). He is responsible for lifting and/or digging the ball out of the net on a second touch. In the old days, the nettie was encouraged to lift the ball up and over the net to the opposing team. As the years went by and the variant styles of the game were changing, the nettie was encouraged to lift the ball back to his team so that they could strike the ball (third touch) to the opposing side and keep the volley going. There was usually one nettie per team back in the old days.

Today, teams are allowed to play with up to two netties simultaneously, or even a third nettie on the far right or left corners of the net-thus preventing an advantage of the opposing team to drop or 'dink' the ball.

The short center spot is a position that was previously called the 'sweeper'. This position was put into fruition in Canada some years ago by the Legend of Toronto East Firoz "Reblo" Hemraj, and the object of the short center is to strike the ball into the net as much as he can so that the nettie can give a nice, high, clean lift to his team to strike back to the opposing side.

The third and probably most important position is the Long Center (formerly third line). He controls the pace, tempo, and speed of the game - and is instrumental in taking points by a method called flights, floating or shooting.

Everyone else on the team, from the front line wings to the backline wings, as well as the serviceman also play crucial roles on the team. The serviceman is not allowed to serve overhand though, and spiking is not allowed on a third touch.

Traditional Volleyball teams play in local, state, provincial, regional, national, and even international tournaments every year. The sport has seen participation growth in cities such as Dar es Salaam, Nairobi, Karachi, and across the United Kingdom. Youth involvement has also increased in many areas. There are discussions regarding the possibility of this version of volleyball being considered for inclusion in major multi-sport events such as the Asian Games or the Olympics someday.

Unlike the FIVB, there is no governing body for traditional volleyball. There was an attempt in the mid to late 1990s to form a North American league called TVANA - Traditional Volleyball Association of North America. This league was formed by Ashad Satchu and Nishadali Jiwa and had three successful tournaments in Houston before folding.

However, the league was instrumental in uniting U.S. and Canadian teams for the first time in years. The tournaments also helped start lasting bonds of sportsmanship and competitive play.

== Variations for youth ==
Volley 2000, invented in Sweden in the 1980s, is adapted for young players and other beginners. It is played with the same rules as standard volleyball with some exceptions: net height is 2,00 m, 4 (min. 3) players in the court, one bounce allowed, underhand serve allowed at the 3 m line, no libero. Normally played best in 3 sets, and peers serve as referees in tournaments. National and international tournaments with hundreds of teams are held for players 10–14 years in Northern Europe.

Kidsvolley was invented in Denmark in 2001 and is adapted for 6–9-year-old kids, as a soft introduction to volleyball, in a very entertaining way, divided into level 0 to 2, according to skill level. The ball is caught with the hands, and if it thrown out, in the net or dropped to the floor, the failing player must leave the court. Depending on the level one player can enter again when a ball is received properly, but whenever all 4 team members are "out" the other team scores points. In Northern Europe Kidsvolley is used in schools and in volleyball clubs, and local tournaments are arranged by the district volleyball associations. In Germany and Austria, volleyball for youth is played with basically standard rules but smaller courts, lower nets and less players 2, 3 or 4, to allow each player have more ball contact and keeping the ball in play for a longer time, thus maintaining a higher level of interest.

Volleystars is a version of the game used for primary school students. Underarm serves are used instead of overarm, and players are allowed to hold the ball. This is called a 'carry'. There are 9 players in each team, and rotation is in an inverted 'S' shape. It is often played in Interschool Sport matches.

== Wallyball ==
Wallyball is played in a racquetball court, which is divided into two halves by a net. The game is played like volleyball, with the added complexity that players may carom the ball off a side wall when playing it into the opponents' court. If a ball played over the net contacts the ceiling, the opponent's back wall, or both side walls without being touched by an opponent, the ball is ruled out of bounds. The pace of the game is generally fast, as the confined quarters encourage quick action and the walls often keep the ball conveniently in play.

== More distant sports ==
=== Bossaball ===
Bossaball is a mix of volleyball, football (soccer), gymnastics and capoeira. The court is a combination of inflatables and trampolines, divided by a net. The headquarters of the sport is in Spain.

=== Fistball ===
Fistball (written in German as "Faustball") has many similarities with volleyball and was known in Central Europe at least from the 16th century, thus of different origin. The game came to the United States in 1911 with Christopher Carlton. It is often played in five player teams, outdoor on a grass field 50 m × 20 m (164 ft × 66 ft). One bounce is allowed between each hit.

=== Footbag net ===
Footbag net is similar to Sepak Takraw and footvolley. It is played with feet instead of hands. Footbag net combines elements of tennis, badminton, and volleyball. Specifically, the court dimensions and layout are similar to those of badminton; the scoring is similar to the old scoring system in volleyball (you must be serving to score); and serves must be diagonal, as in tennis. It is played one on one or in teams of two. Footbag net games can be played to eleven or fifteen points, although the winners must win by at least two points.

=== Footvolley ===
Footvolley combines beach volleyball and soccer skills. The difference is that the players may not contact the ball with their hands or arms; instead they can use all other body parts including their feet, head and chest, etc. The sport originated in Brazil, but is quickly becoming popular in the US, Europe, and Asia.

=== Native Ball/Nadan Panthu Kali ===
Originated and popular in Kerala, India.

=== Sepak Takraw ===
Sepak Takraw is a sport popular in Asia, similar to footvolley and volleyball. The game is played on a badminton doubles court. Unlike in volleyball, the use of hands is not permitted, each player may only touch the ball once before it is kicked back over the net, there is no rotation in the defence position, and players use their feet to get the ball over the net. Another similar game played with the feet and originating in Thailand is Buka ball.
