= Killing of Timothy Stansbury =

Event in NYC on January 24, 2004

The killing of Timothy Stansbury Jr. occurred in New York City on January 24, 2004. Stansbury was an unarmed 19-year-old in New York City who was shot and killed by New York Police Department Officer Richard S. Neri Jr. Officer Neri and a partner were patrolling the rooftop of a housing project in the Bedford-Stuyvesant neighborhood of Brooklyn at about 1 a.m. Officer Neri, with his gun drawn, approached a rooftop door to check the stairway inside. Neri testified to a Brooklyn grand jury that he fired his standard Glock 19 pistol unintentionally when he was startled as Stansbury pushed open the rooftop door. Stansbury, a resident of an adjoining building, died from one shot in the chest. The grand jury found the shooting to be accidental.

== Initial official reaction ==
Unlike previous incidents, the official response of the NYPD was quick and condemnatory. Said Police Commissioner Ray Kelly "At this point, based on the facts we have gathered, there appears to be no justification for the shooting... This is a tragic incident that compels us to take an in-depth look at our tactics and training, both for new and veteran officers."

== Investigation ==
A grand jury convened on January 30, 2004, to investigate the shooting; this was also the day of Stansbury's funeral.

Controversy over NYPD Commissioner Kelly's initial statements on the shooting grew, with Patrick J. Lynch, the president of the Patrolmen's Benevolent Association (the NYPD's union) stating: "Commissioner Kelly gave a message to the 23,000 New York City police officers that said basically this: take all the risks of doing your job, go up on all those roofs, patrol all those subway platforms, walk the streets day and night, take the risks to yourself, take the risks to your family, but then when the worst happens, when there's a tragedy, [ . . . ] you will not have the backing of the New York police commissioner".

== Grand jury decision ==
On February 17, 2004, after nearly a month of investigation, the grand jury declined to indict Officer Neri on charges of criminally negligent homicide and manslaughter, finding instead the shooting to be accidental. Mayor Mike Bloomberg who, like Kelly, had not been overtly supportive of Officer Neri said: "Although the death of Timothy Stansbury was a heartbreaking tragedy, a grand jury today decided that Officer Neri's actions were not criminal. The Police Department will conduct a review of the case to determine the appropriate course of action."

== Aftermath ==
In 2006, Officer Neri was stripped of his gun permanently, given a 30-day suspension without pay and reassigned to a property clerk's office by Police Commissioner Kelly, a punishment the Stansbury family considered inadequate. As of 2011, Neri was still employed with the New York Police Department making $76,488 annually.

In May 2007, the New York Police Department agreed to pay $2 million to the family of Timothy Stansbury.

"Fight Until the End", a song on the album Sabacolypse: A Change Gon' Come recorded with vocalist Immortal Technique, is dedicated to Stansbury. A short documentary about the shooting, Bullets in the Hood: A Bed-Stuy Story, won the 2005 Sundance Film Festival Grand Jury Prize in Short Filmmaking.

== See also ==
- List of unarmed African Americans killed by law enforcement officers in the United States
- List of killings by law enforcement officers in the United States
