= 9-man =

Chinese-American volleyball team sport

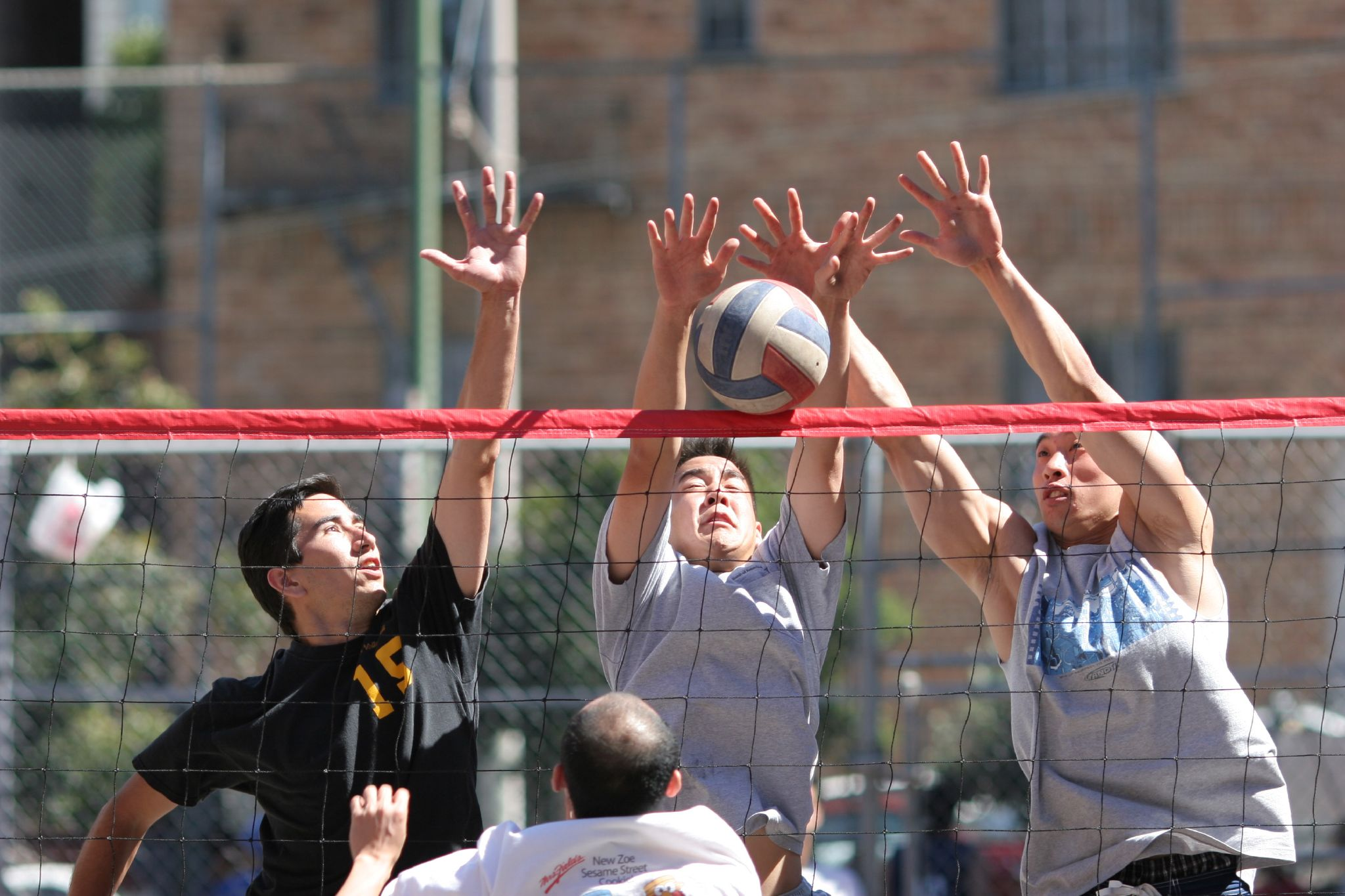
A triple block in a game of 9-man volleyball

9-man (also nine-man, nineman, 9man) is an urban adaptation of volleyball team sport utilizing nine players per side and a slightly larger court (10 by 20 meters). The players do not rotate, which allows for specialization, and leading to a faster, more chaotic game.

Historically, the sport was played by Chinese immigrants to the United States, who predominantly hailed from Toisan (Taishan) city in Guangdong province of China. Today its tournaments draw thousands of players from across North America.

== History ==
In the late 1930s, the sport was used as a means to socially connect the laborers in Chinatowns across the United States. Teams from Boston and Providence, Rhode Island held the first organized nine-man tournament in 1938, which later spread to Chinatowns in other large US and Canadian cities.

The first annual tournament was held in 1944 in Boston, according to the Chinese Historical Society of New England.

The North American version of 9-Man continues to grow today with a popular rotating tournament called the North American Chinese Invitational Volleyball Tournament (NACIVT) drawing thousands of players and spectators each September over Labor Day weekend.

== Player Eligibility ==
It is unclear whether the sport was also played in the Asian Games in 1958 and in 1962, held in Tokyo and Jakarta, respectively, or if they were simply playing volleyball with nine players. The sport has not made a reappearance in the Asian Games since, and many believe that the rules of nine-man are exclusive to the community that plays in North America. The sport is the subject of an award-winning documentary called 9-Man that was completed in 2014 and had its world premiere at IFFBoston on April 27, 2014. The film was broadcast on the PBS World Channel series America ReFramed on May 5, 2015.

NACIVT rules stipulate that at any given time, each team must have at least six players of "100 percent" Chinese descent on the court. The remaining three players must be of Asian descent; the NACIVT explicitly states who qualifies as Asian based on the country of origin of his ancestors - (Asian: origins from: Myanmar (formerly Burma), Cambodia, China, Hong Kong, Indonesia, Japan, Korea, Laos, Malaysia, Mongolia, Philippines, Singapore, Taiwan, Thailand, Vietnam). In addition, only men are allowed to play 9-man.

== Rules ==
There are a number of ways in which 9-man rules differ from traditional Volleyball rules. As only men can play 9-man, during international tournaments, such as the NACIVT, women play by six-player Volleyball rules.

Rotating: Players in 9-man do not rotate as in traditional volleyball. As such, players tend to specialize in two or three positions.

Serving: Only 3 players are allowed to serve per team, it may be any 3 players. Teams must rotate servers. The players may serve from any position behind the line. Jump serves are not allowed as one foot must remain on the ground while serving.

Scoring: 9-man implements a rally scoring system. Teams do not have to be serving in order to win a point. The first team to 21 points while holding a lead of at least two points is the winner. If there is no two-point lead, the first team to 25 points wins.

Touch Limit: Each team is allowed three touches before the ball must be sent over the net to the opposing team. A block counts as a touch. A team is awarded an additional touch if the ball contacts the net during a volley. The other team is awarded a point if the ball comes into contact with any body part besides the arms and hands.

Blocking: Players cannot penetrate across the plane of the net (called "piking"). Blocks must be straight up. If the ball comes into contact with a player's head, the play goes to the other team.

Ball Handling: There are several specialized moves in traditional nine-man. The preferred method of passing the ball is called a chai ball—an underhand scooping move. The fai-gok or fastball is typically the centermost position in the offense that has a signature move resembling a basketball dunk. The player pushes the ball in a single non-upward direction and then quickly changes the direction of the ball slamming it to the ground. A net ball (pushing the ball into the net so that it rebounds and you can play it again) is often performed by the setter to upset the timing and rhythm of the game and throw off the defense.

NACIVT Rules: NACIVT rules stipulate that at any given time, each team must have at least six players of "100 percent" Chinese descent on the court. The remaining three players must be of Asian descent. If this rule is violated through another team issuing a challenge, a warning may be given to the team. Following the warning, failure to cooperate may result in either loss of game or disqualification.

== Tournaments ==
The North American Chinese Invitational Volleyball Tournament (NACIVT) is held every Labor Day weekend and features men's 9-man volleyball and women's 6's volleyball teams. The tournament is generally held outdoors and played on pavement, with the courts typically set-up in a large parking lot or even on the streets. Because of changes in climate the tournament can also be held indoors (ex: Convention Centers.) It is very much a cultural phenomenon; two-thirds of the players on each team must be 100% Chinese, and the rest must be of Asian descent. The inaugural NACIVT tournament was held in Boston in 1944. Today there are teams representing Boston, Maryland, Los Angeles, Chicago, North Carolina, Houston, Montreal, New York City, Philadelphia, San Francisco, San Diego, Toronto, and Washington, D.C. In 2009, a team from Shanghai was invited to participate in the Los Angeles NACIVT, and the players who were only familiar with six-person volleyball played with 9-man rules for the first time.

Each year there are also mini tournaments held in Toronto, New York City, Philadelphia, Washington D.C., Los Angeles and San Francisco leading up to the annual NACIVT.

The New York Mini hosted by the New York Strangers, is one of the biggest tournaments leading up to the Labor Day weekend Nationals. It is held in Seward Park in Chinatown, averaging about 80 teams per year. Generally it is held in mid-July with teams participating from Boston, Washington D.C., Philadelphia, Toronto, Montreal and North Carolina.

9-Man players at the New York Mini tournament in July 2025

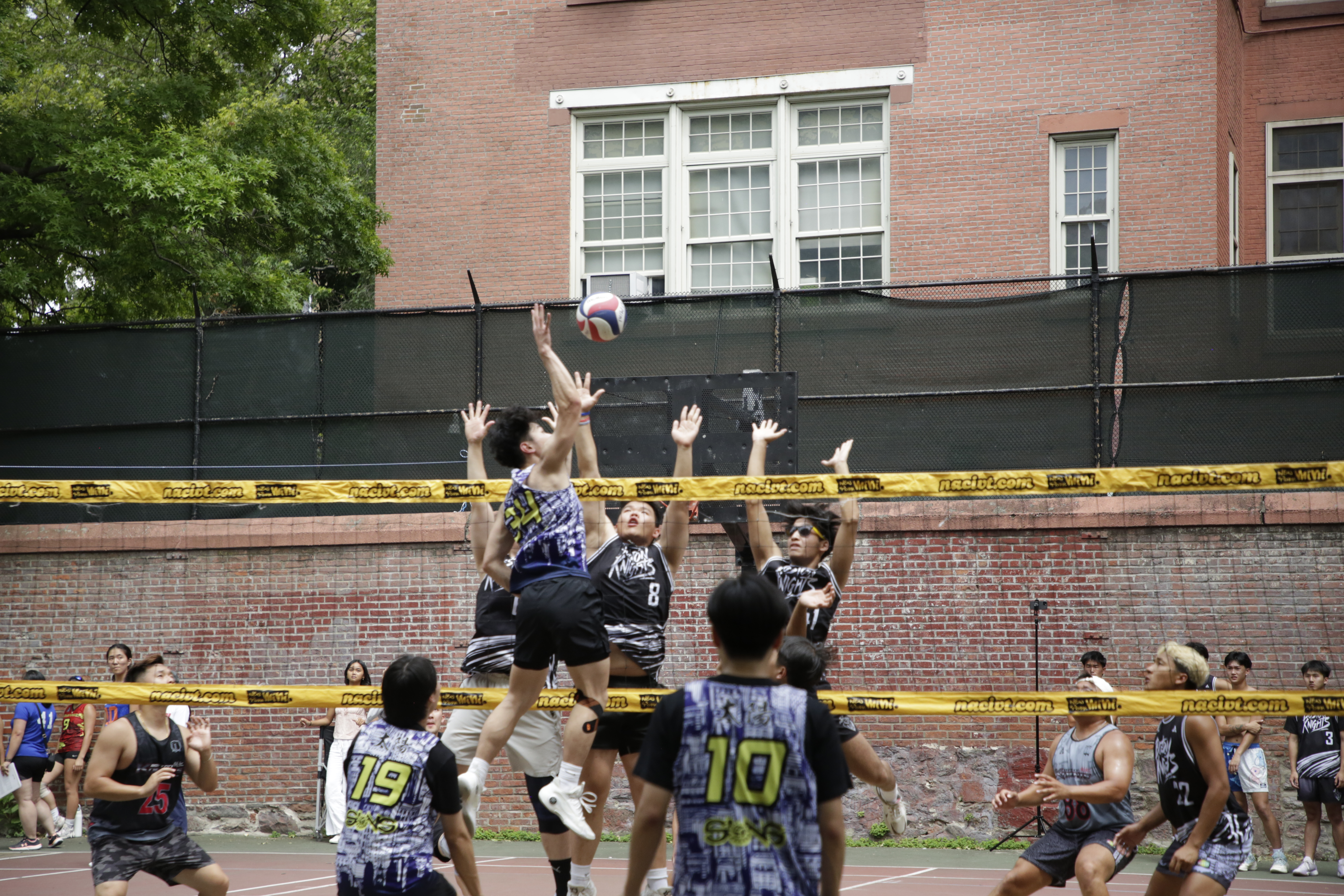

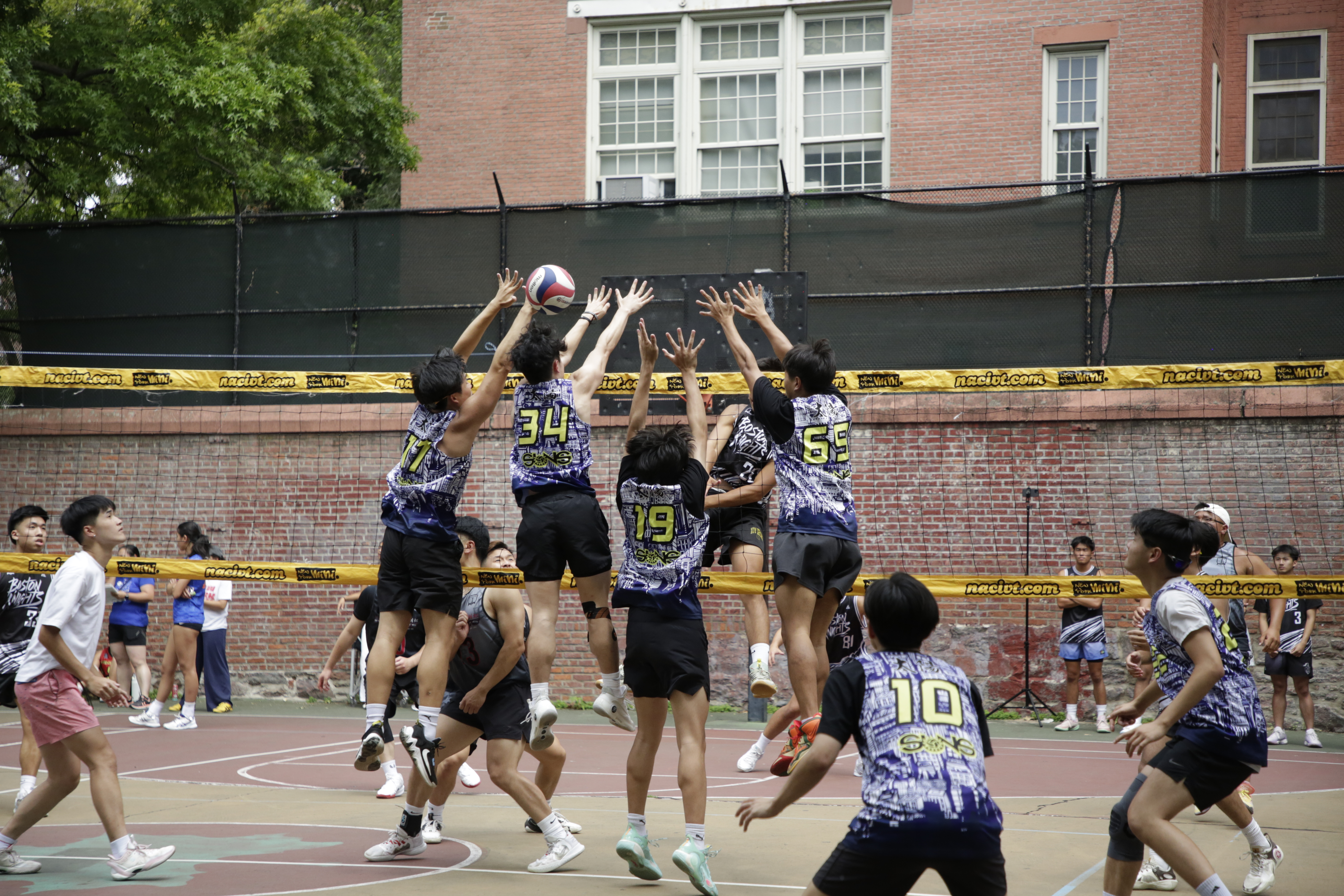

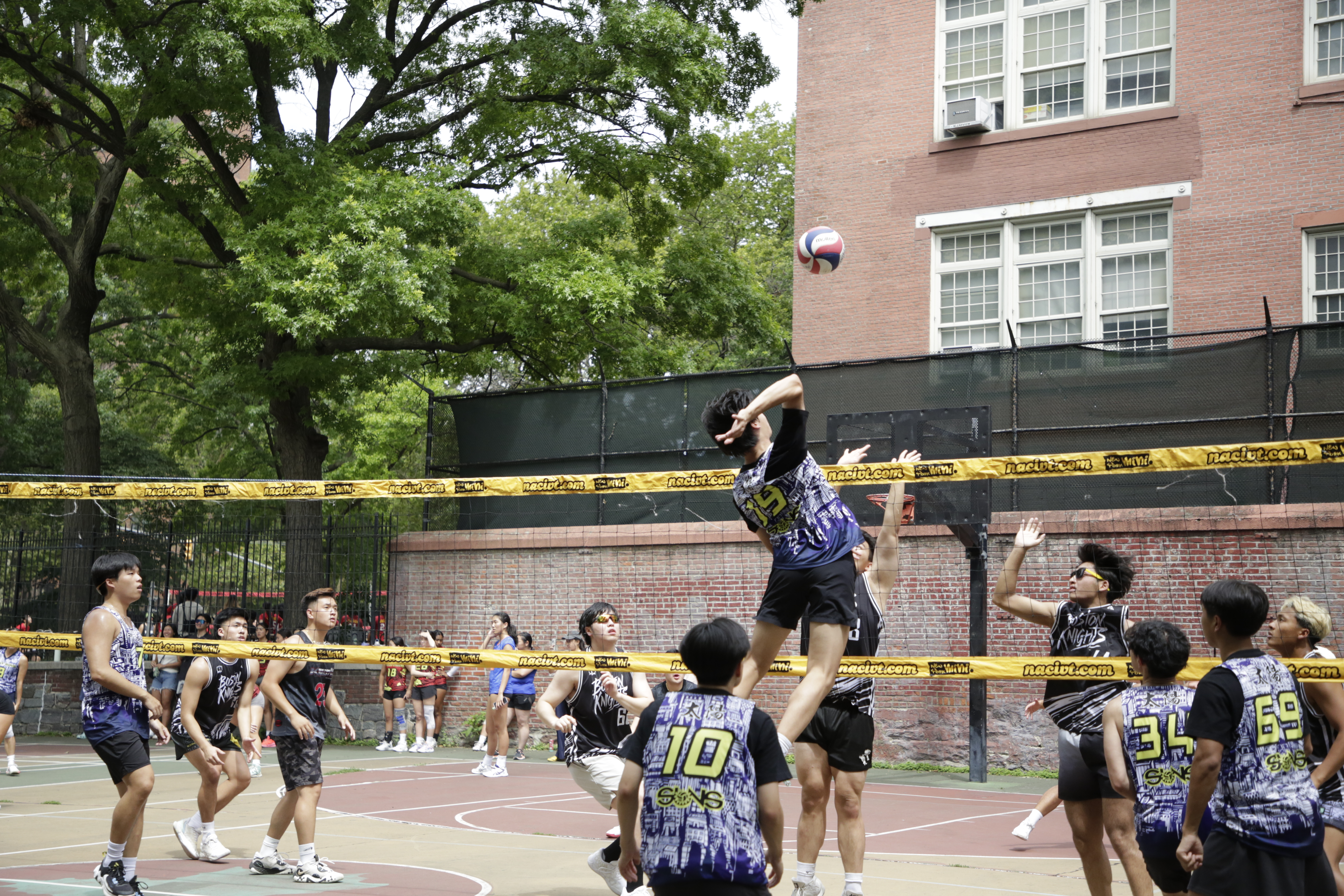

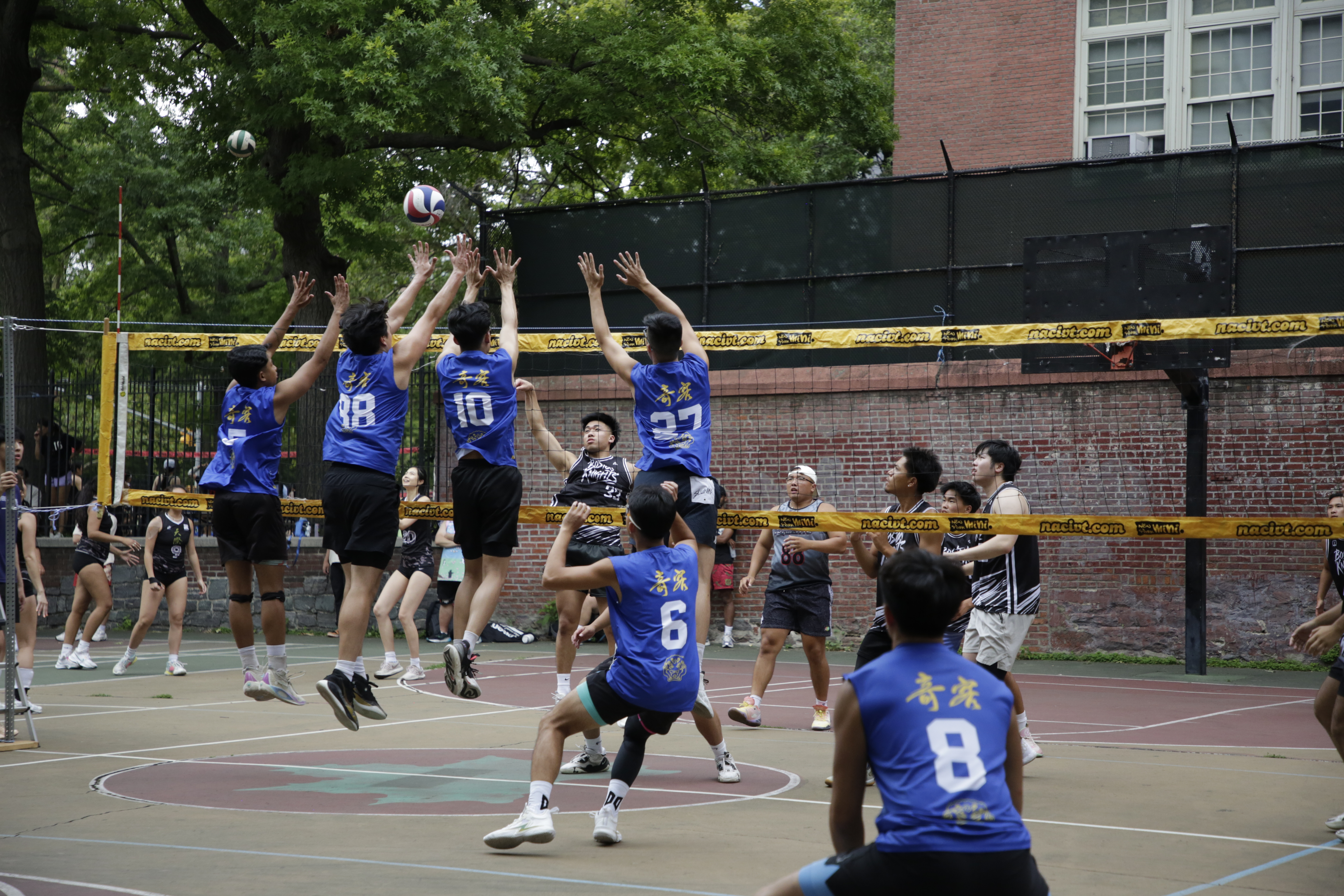

The August Moon tournament is played every August in Boston at Reggie Wong Memorial Park (formerly Pagoda Park) in Chinatown on Kneeland Street. This tournament features 9-man teams from the Boston area including the Boston Rising Tide, Boston Chinese Freemasons, Boston Knights, and the Boston Hurricanes.

Toronto typically hosts a mini tournament during Canada Day in which teams from Toronto and Montreal play.

The 69th NACIVT was hosted in Washington, D.C. over the 3-day 2013 Labor Day weekend.

The 70th NACIVT was hosted by San Francisco teams in Las Vegas over the 2014 Labor Day weekend.

The 71st NACIVT was hosted in New York over the 2015 Labor Day weekend.

The 72nd NACIVT was hosted in Los Angeles over the 2016 Labor Day weekend.

The 73rd NACIVT was hosted in Fort Lauderdale over the 2017 Labor Day weekend.

The 74th NACIVT was hosted in Montreal over the 2018 Labor Day weekend.

The 75th NACIVT was hosted in Toronto over the 2019 Labor Day weekend.
