= Rodovia Euclides da Cunha =

Highway in São Paulo

SP-320
- Rodovia Euclides da Cunha

Major junctions
- East end: Mirassol, SP
- SP-310; SP-377; SP-479; SP-461; SP-527; SP-543; SP-463; SP-561; SP-595
- West end: Rubinéia, SP

Location
- Country: Brazil
- State: São Paulo

Highway system
- Highways in Brazil; Federal; São Paulo State Highways

Rodovia Euclides da Cunha (official denomination SP-320) is a state highway in the state of São Paulo. The highway is named after Brazilian writer Euclides da Cunha.

The highway begins in Mirassol, on the SP-310, and ends in the city of Rubinéia, at the Paraná River, where it connects with the state of Mato Grosso do Sul by a road-rail bridge.

== Cities served by the highway ==
- Fernandópolis
- Jales
- Mirassol
- Santa Fé do Sul
- Tanabi
- Votuporanga

== Junctions ==
- SP-310
- SP-377
- SP-479
- SP-461
- SP-527
- SP-543
- SP-463
- SP-561
- SP-595

== See also ==
- Highway system of São Paulo
- List of state highways in São Paulo
