= Álvares Florence =

- Municipality
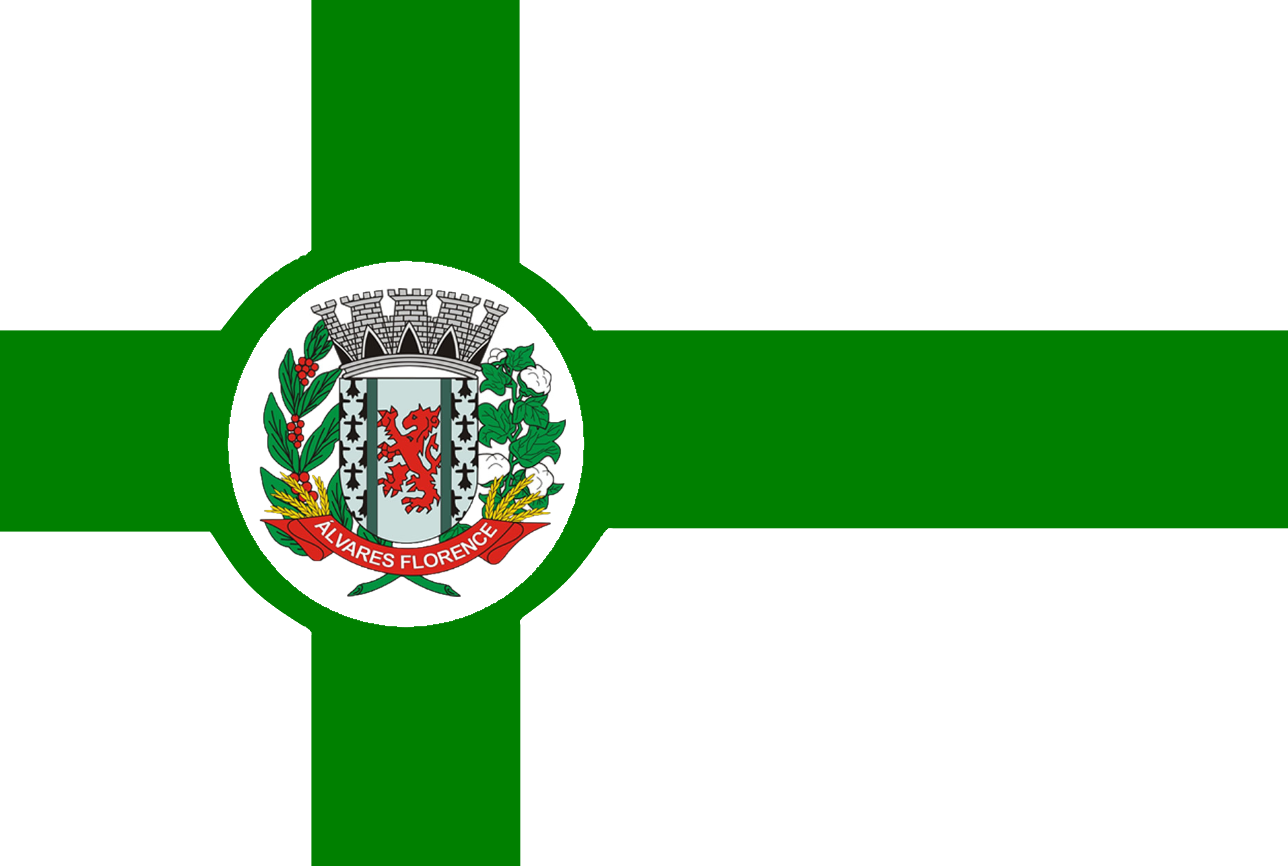
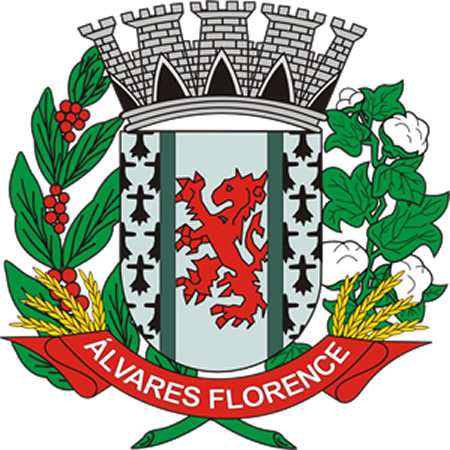
- Flag Coat of arms

- Location of Álvares Florence

- Location within Brazil
- Coordinates: 20°19′14″S 49°54′34″W
- Country: Brazil
- Region: Southeast
- State: São Paulo
- Mesoregion: São José do Rio Preto
- Established: 2009

Government
  - Mayor: Alberto César de Caires (DEM)

Area
  - Total: 362.9 km^{2} (140.1 sq mi)

Population (2020)
  - Total: 3,647
  - Density: 10.74/km^{2} (27.8/sq mi)
- Time zone: UTC−3 (BRT)
- Postal Code: 15540-000
- Area code: +55 17
- Website: Prefecture of Álvares Florence

Álvares Florence is a municipality in the state of São Paulo, Brazil. It has a population of 3,647 inhabitants (IBGE/2020) and an area of 362.9 km^{2}.

== History ==
At the end of the 19th century, Joaquim Pedro da Silva built the first residence on the region. With the time a village appeared, being named São João Batista do Marinheiro.

In 1926, the village was elevated to district of Tanabi, with the name of Vila Monteiro, and on November 30, 1944, the name changed to Igapira, being a district of the newly created city of Votuporanga.

The city was officially established as a municipality on December 24, 1948, changing its name to the current form. On April 10, 1949, the municipal chamber was installed.

Map of the state of São Paulo (1948).

== Demographics ==
Historical population (municipality)
Year	Population	%±
1950	9,087	—
1960	8,972	−1.3%
1970	8,334	−7.1%
1980	6,588	−21.0%
1991	5,050	−23.3%
2000	4,316	−14.5%
2010	3,897	−9.7%
2022	3,915	0.5%

== Geography ==
The city is located on the northwest of the state, 538 km from the city of São Paulo. Álvares Florence belongs to the Microregion of Votuporanga.

=== Roads ===
- SP-461 - Rodovia Péricles Bellini
- SP-320 in Votuporanga

== Economy ==
The Tertiary sector corresponds to 43.88% of the Álvares Florence GDP. Agriculture and livestock is 29.45% of the GDP and the Industry corresponds to 26.67%.

== Media ==
In telecommunications, the city was served by Companhia de Telecomunicações do Estado de São Paulo until 1975, when it began to be served by Telecomunicações de São Paulo. In July 1998, this company was acquired by Telefónica, which adopted the Vivo brand in 2012.

The company is currently an operator of cell phones, fixed lines, internet (fiber optics/4G) and television (satellite and cable).

== See also ==
- List of municipalities in São Paulo
- Interior of São Paulo
