= SP-595 (São Paulo highway) =

State highway in São Paulo, Brazil

SP-595

Route information
- Length: 120.847 km (75.091 mi)

Location
- Country: Brazil
- State: São Paulo

Highway system
- Highways in Brazil; Federal; São Paulo State Highways

SP-595 is a state highway in the state of São Paulo in Brazil.

== Description ==
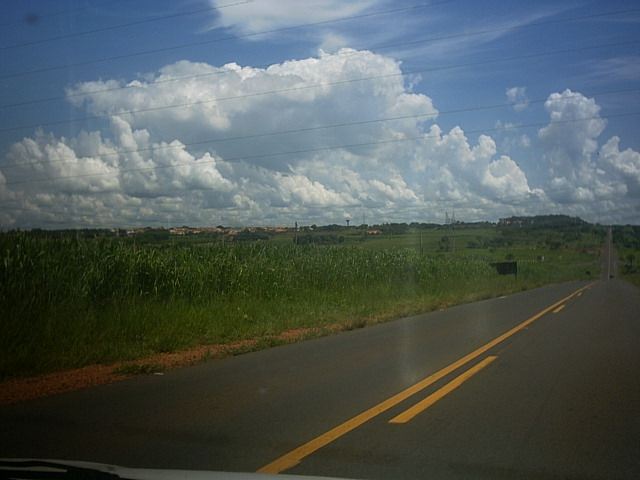
Section of SP-595 in Ilha Solteira.

Main points of passage: SP 300 (Castilho) – SP 310 – SP 320 – Santa Rita d'Oeste

=== Sections ===
Gerson Dourado de Oliveira Highway

Section of SP-595 located between kilometers 000 and 050+150m of SP-595, passing through the municipalities of Castilho, Itapura, and Ilha Solteira. It is paved and approximately 50 km in length. Its current name was proposed by then state deputy Dalla Pria and sanctioned by Mario Covas.

Barrage Workers Highway

Section of SP-595 located between kilometers 50.150m and 85.810m, passing through the municipalities of Ilha Solteira, Suzanápolis, Rubineia, and Santa Fé do Sul.

Mayor Ettore Bottura Highway

This is the section between kilometers 85.810 and 113.110 of SP-595. Ettore Bottura, former mayor of Santa Fé do Sul, advocated for the original route of SP-595 to be changed and diverted to connect the Santa Fé do Sul region to Ilha Solteira, where the Ilha Solteira Hydroelectric Plant was being built.

== Characteristics ==
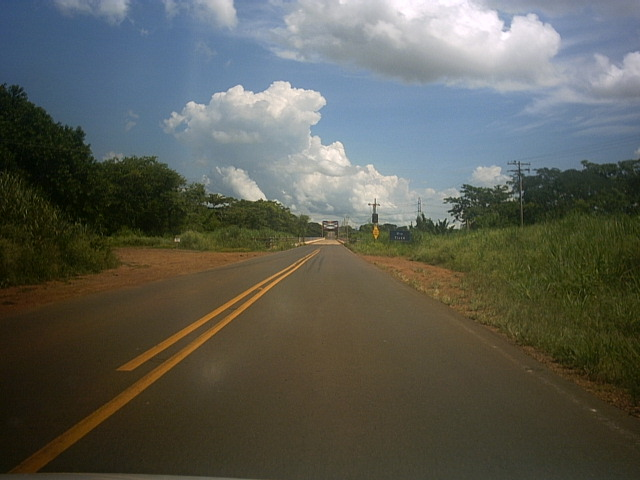
Section of SP-595 in Itapura.

=== Length ===
- Initial Km: 0.000
- Final Km: 120.847

=== Served localities ===
- Castilho
- Itapura
- Ilha Solteira
- Suzanápolis
- Rubinéia
- Esmeralda
- Santa Fé do Sul
- Nova Canaã Paulista
- Três Fronteiras
- Santa Rita d'Oeste
