= SP-461 (São Paulo highway) =

Roadway in Brazil

SP-461

Route information
- Length: 165.316 km (102.723 mi)

Location
- Country: Brazil
- State: São Paulo

Highway system
- Highways in Brazil; Federal; São Paulo State Highways

SP-461 is a state highway in the state of São Paulo in Brazil.

== Designations ==
The highway is designated with the following names along its route:

Name: Gabriel Melhado Highway

- From - to: Bilac – Birigui
- Legislation: Law No. 2,476 of 10/14/1980

Name: Deputy Roberto Rollemberg Highway

- From - to: Birigui – Turiúba
- Legislation: Law No. 9,545 of 05/02/1997

Name: Dr. Otaviano Cardoso Filho Highway

- From - to: Turiúba – Nhandeara
- Legislation: Law No. 2,912 of 06/25/1981

Name: Péricles Bellini Highway

- From - to: Nhandeara – Votuporanga – Cardoso
- Legislation: Law No. 2,219 of 12/13/1979

== Description ==
Main points of passage: Bilac – Birigui – SP-310 (Nhandeara) – Cardoso

== Characteristics ==
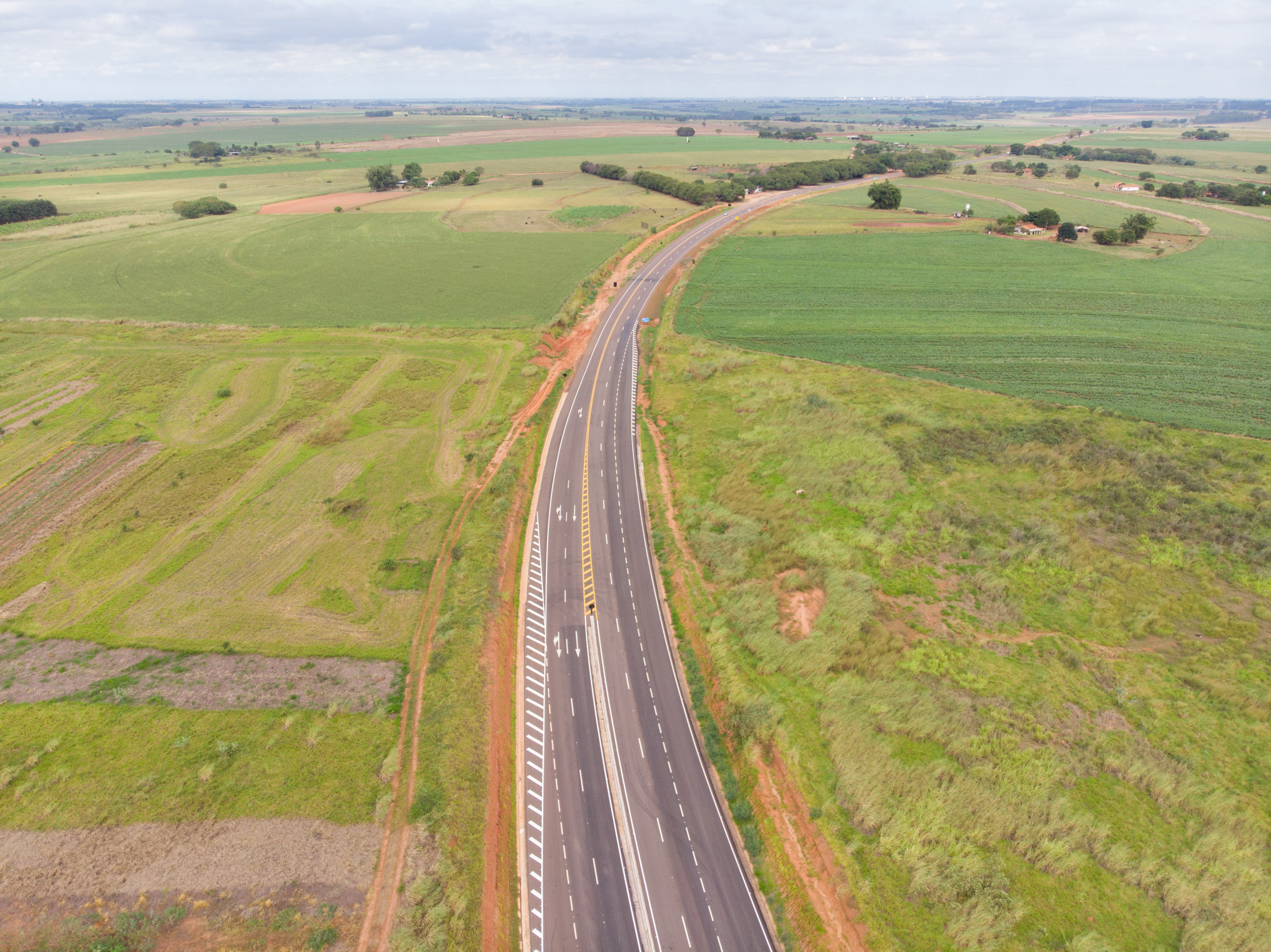
Section of SP-461 in Birigui.

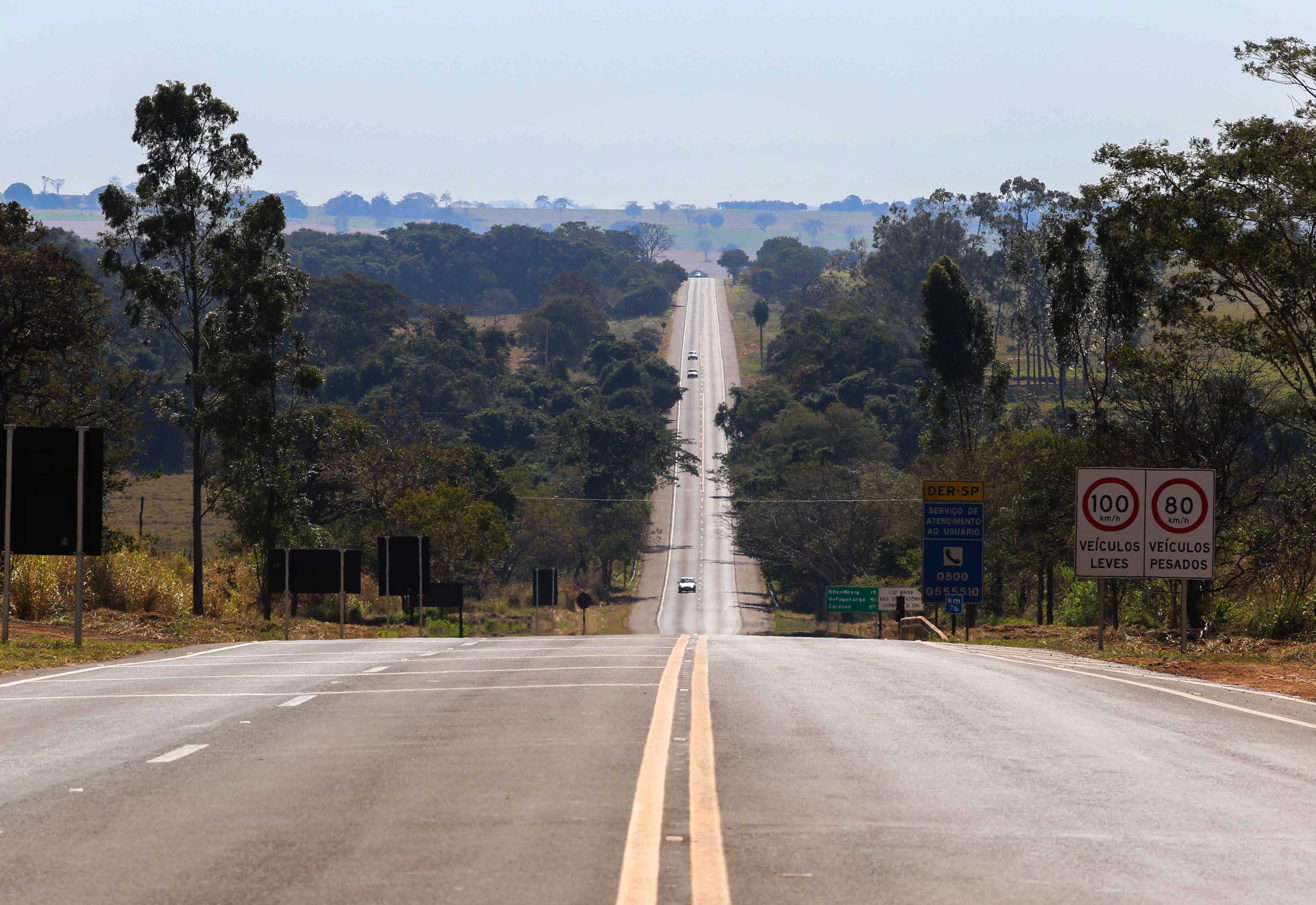
Section of SP-461 in Nhandeara.

=== Length ===
- Initial Km: 0.000
- Final Km: 165.316

=== Served localities ===
- Bilac
- Birigui
- Brejo Alegre
- Buritama
- Turiúba
- Monções
- Nhandeara
- Votuporanga
- Álvares Florence
- Vila Alves
- Cardoso
- São João do Marinheiro
