= Votuporanga =

- Municipality
- Municipality of Votuporanga
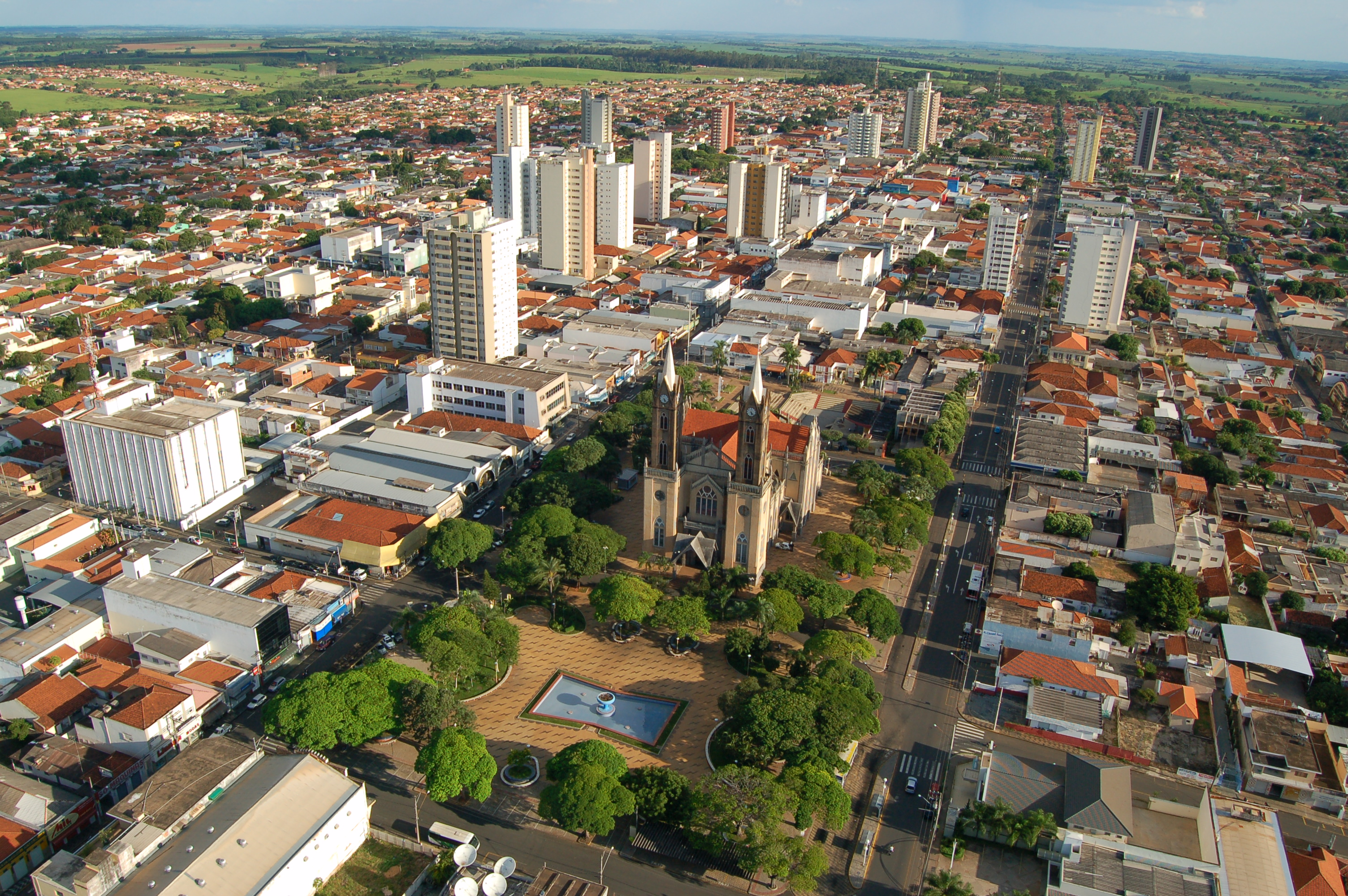
- Aerial view of the town centre

- Flag Coat of arms
- Nickname: City of the Soft Breezes
- Location of Votuporanga
- Coordinates: 20°25′02″S 49°58′22″W
- Country: Brazil
- Region: Southeast
- State: São Paulo
- Mesoregion: São José do Rio Preto
- Established: 2009

Government
  - Mayor: Jorge Seba

Area
  - Total: 424.11 km^{2} (163.75 sq mi)
- Elevation: 525 m (1,722 ft)

Population (2022 Census)
  - Total: 96,634
  - Estimate (2025): 100,568
  - Density: 199.69/km^{2} (517.2/sq mi)
- Time zone: UTC-3 (UTC-3)
  - Summer (DST): UTC-2 (UTC-2)
- Postal Code: 15500-000
- Area code: +55 17
- Website: Votuporanga, São Paulo

Votuporanga is a municipality in the Northwest of the São Paulo state, Brazil. The city is located 520 km from São Paulo. The population of the city, according to the 2022 Census, is 96,634 inhabitants. Votuporanga is the center of a Microregion with 191,475 inhabitants. In 2018, the Roman Catholic Diocese of Votuporanga was formed by Pope Francis.

== History ==
Votuporanga's history is closely linked to that of the coffee trade in Brazil. The land where the city is located originally belonged to the Marinheiro de Cima Farm, owned by Francisco Schmidt. Schmidt was forced to sell the land to Theodor Wille, owner of the Wille, Schmillinski e Cia. company, to settle outstanding debts. The land was thus divided up into plots and sold at a low price. Little by little the area's population began to grow, until at last, becoming part of the district of Vila Monteiro, now Álvares Florence, and the municipal district of Monte Aprazível.

The name, Votuporanga, was suggested by Sebastião Almeida de Oliveira, notary public for the local town of Tanabi. Votuporanga, in Tupi language, means "Good winds" or "Soft breezes". The town on Votuporanga was founded on August 8, 1937. Father Isidoro Cordeiro Paranhos celebrated a Catholic mass on this same day, thus becoming one of the pillars of the town's heritage.

In 1945, Votuporanga was decreed to be a municipal district, and center, for the local county. The first mayor was Francisco Villar Horta.

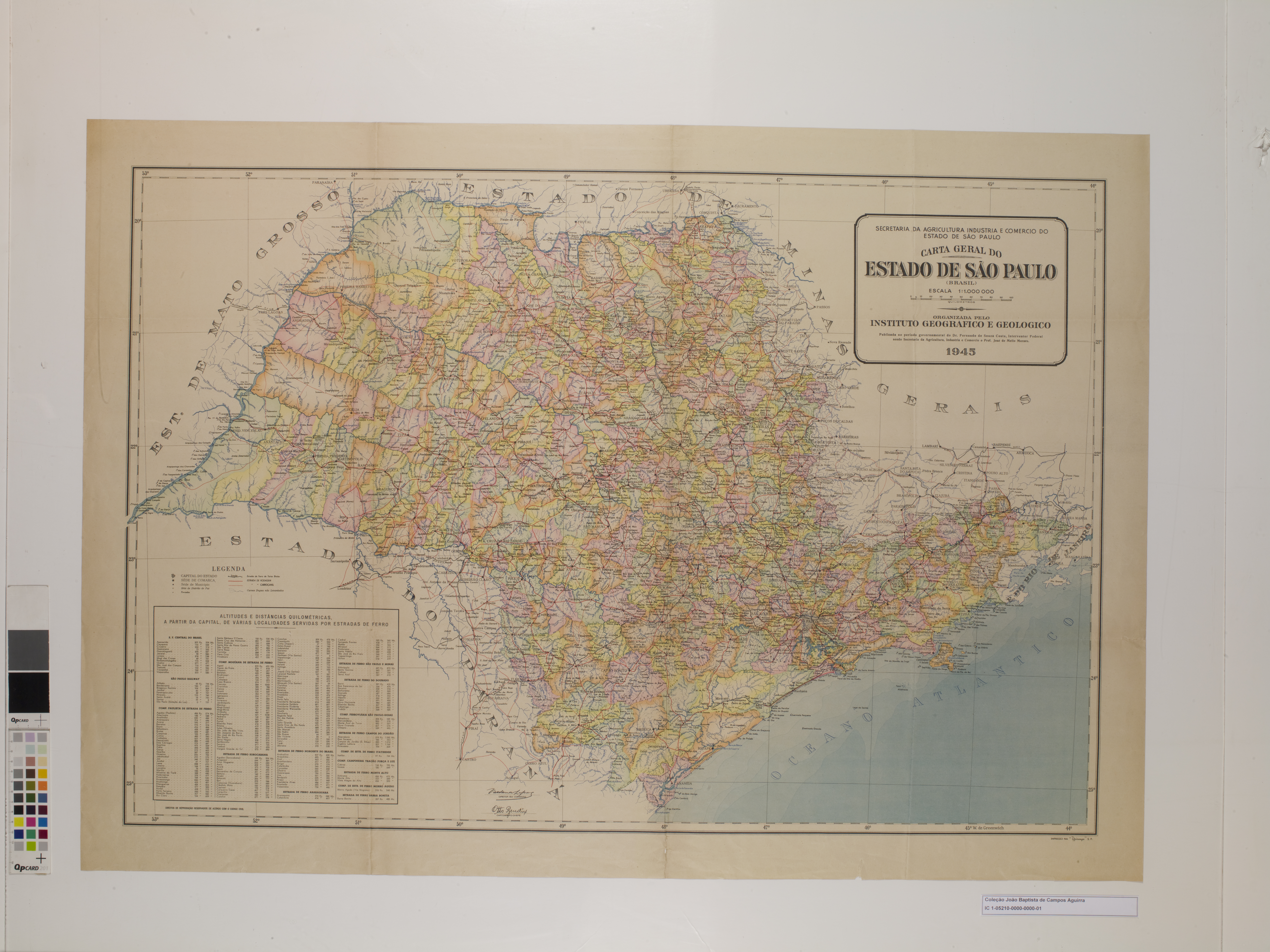
Map of the state of São Paulo (1944).

In the same year, an important development took place with the arrival of the Railroad Araraquarense, providing a vital rail connection to the Port of Santos. Two other principal features of the city are the Santa Casa de Misericórdia hospital and the contemporary Igreja de Nossa Senhora Aparecida (Church of Our Lady Aparecida).

In the 1970s, the state highway Rodovia Euclides da Cunha, SP-320, which connects Votuporanga to the state capital, was tarmacked, helping to develop the growth of the town. Also around this time, the educational institution UNIFEV was created. In the 1980s, the city experienced economic growth, mainly in the Furniture, agricultural machinery industry and metalworking for the haulage industry.

=== Name ===
In the Tupi language, votu means "air", "breeze" and poranga means "nice", "good". Literally this term means "good air", "good winds" or "soft breezes". The city is known as the "City of soft breezes".

== Economy ==
73.85% of the city's GDP is generated by the Tertiary sector, and 23.61% comes from Industry. Votuporanga has a significant furniture industry, characterized by small and medium companies. These firms employ around 15,000 workers.

== Demographics ==
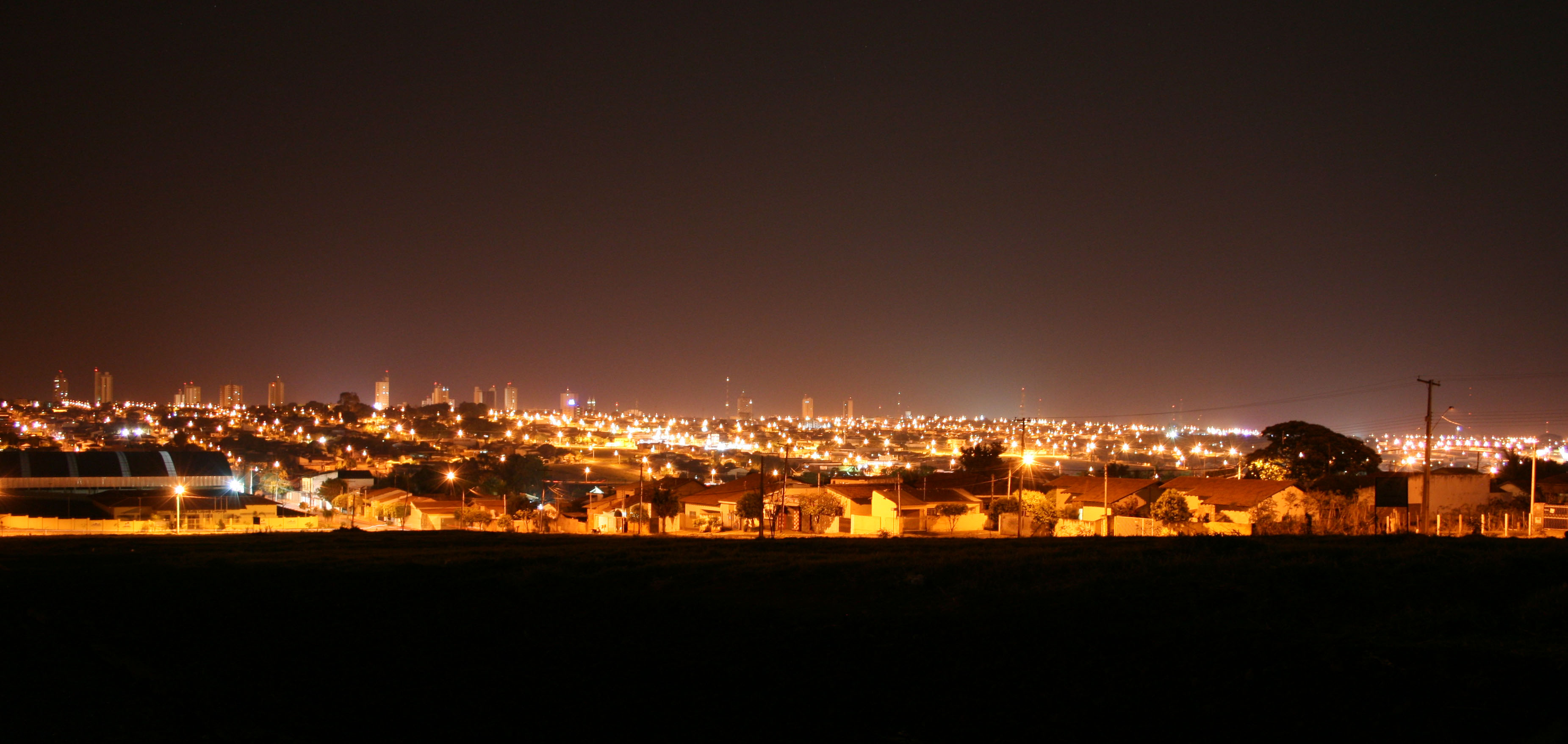
Votuporanga at night

The HDI of the city, measured by the UNDP, was 0.817 in 2000.

=== Population ===
Historical population (municipality)
Year	Population	%±
1950	22,433	—
1960	32,945	46.9%
1970	39,443	19.7%
1980	52,279	32.5%
1991	66,166	26.6%
2000	75,641	14.3%
2010	84,692	12.0%
2022	96,634	14.1%

== Urban structure ==
=== Healthcare ===
Votuporanga has 2 hospitals, Santa Casa de Misericórdia de Votuporanga and Casa de Saúde e Maternidade Nossa Srª Aparecida. There are also 2 free access priority healthcare facilities for non-critical emergency treatment, Mini-Hospital "Fortunata G. Pozzobon" and a UPA 24hrs.

=== Education ===
There are 4 universities in the city: the UNIFEV, IFSP Câmpus Votuporanga, the REGES, and a branch of the FATEC (Faculdade de Teologia e Ciências).

== Media ==
In telecommunications, the city was served by Telecomunicações de São Paulo. In July 1998, this company was acquired by Telefónica, which adopted the Vivo brand in 2012. The company is currently an operator of cell phones, fixed lines, internet (fiber optics/4G) and television (satellite and cable).

== Culture ==
Votuporanga is well known for its nightlife. With the local motto "ímã da diversão" (Magnet of Entertainment), it is recognized as one of the most vibrant nightlife centres in the microregion.

Pride in Votuporanga's cow-breeding heritage is one of the cornerstones of Votuporangese identity. "Ópera," the most expensive cow ever sold in Brazil, is from the Votuporanga microregion. Numerous streets, a shopping centre and a local brothel are named in her honour.

== Sports ==
The city has one professional football club, Clube Atlético Votuporanguense.

== Transportation ==
The city is served by Domingos Pignatari State Airport.

== Climate ==
Climate data for Votuporanga (1981–2010 normals, extremes 1976–present)
Month	Jan	Feb	Mar	Apr	May	Jun	Jul	Aug	Sep	Oct	Nov	Dec	Year
Record high °C (°F)	40.9 (105.6)	41.4 (106.5)	41.1 (106.0)	39.5 (103.1)	38.4 (101.1)	36.9 (98.4)	37.1 (98.8)	39.8 (103.6)	42.6 (108.7)	43.5 (110.3)	42.4 (108.3)	41.2 (106.2)	43.5 (110.3)
Mean daily maximum °C (°F)	30.7 (87.3)	31.1 (88.0)	30.9 (87.6)	30.5 (86.9)	27.8 (82.0)	27.5 (81.5)	28.0 (82.4)	30.2 (86.4)	31.2 (88.2)	32.1 (89.8)	31.6 (88.9)	31.1 (88.0)	30.2 (86.4)
Daily mean °C (°F)	25.3 (77.5)	25.4 (77.7)	25.2 (77.4)	24.5 (76.1)	21.5 (70.7)	20.8 (69.4)	20.8 (69.4)	22.8 (73.0)	24.1 (75.4)	25.5 (77.9)	25.5 (77.9)	25.5 (77.9)	23.9 (75.0)
Mean daily minimum °C (°F)	21.4 (70.5)	21.3 (70.3)	21.0 (69.8)	19.6 (67.3)	16.6 (61.9)	15.6 (60.1)	15.1 (59.2)	16.7 (62.1)	18.3 (64.9)	20.0 (68.0)	20.5 (68.9)	21.1 (70.0)	18.9 (66.0)
Record low °C (°F)	17.5 (63.5)	18.0 (64.4)	17.6 (63.7)	15.5 (59.9)	9.9 (49.8)	4.1 (39.4)	5.2 (41.4)	7.3 (45.1)	12.4 (54.3)	14.5 (58.1)	14.3 (57.7)	14.4 (57.9)	4.1 (39.4)
Average precipitation mm (inches)	291.3 (11.47)	200.8 (7.91)	152.1 (5.99)	84.1 (3.31)	56.4 (2.22)	21.8 (0.86)	16.4 (0.65)	18.1 (0.71)	60.2 (2.37)	103.8 (4.09)	138.8 (5.46)	200.8 (7.91)	1,344.6 (52.94)
Average precipitation days (≥ 1.0 mm)	16	13	11	5	5	2	2	2	6	8	10	14	94
Average relative humidity (%)	76.2	74.2	73.2	67.7	66.8	61.7	54.6	48.9	54.1	60.0	64.9	72.0	64.5
Mean monthly sunshine hours	178.0	189.8	216.1	235.2	221.5	233.0	249.4	246.8	203.5	218.9	217.3	203.9	2,613.4
Source: Instituto Nacional de Meteorologia

== See also ==
- List of municipalities in São Paulo
- Interior of São Paulo
