= Nhandeara =

- Municipality
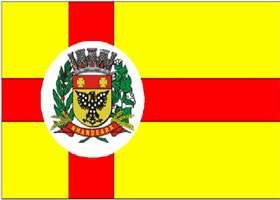
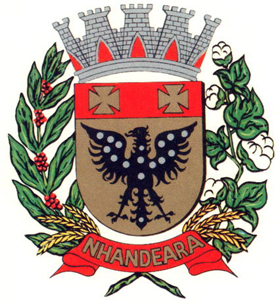
- Flag Coat of arms

- Location of Nhandeara

- Location within Brazil
- Coordinates: 20°41′40″S 50°02′19″W
- Country: Brazil
- Region: Southeast
- State: São Paulo
- Mesoregion: São José do Rio Preto
- Established: 2009

Government
  - Mayor: Ozínio Odilon da Silveira

Area
  - Total: 435.8 km^{2} (168.3 sq mi)
- Elevation: 475 m (1,558 ft)

Population (2020)
  - Total: 11,527
  - Density: 24.6/km^{2} (64/sq mi)
- Time zone: UTC−3 (BRT)
- Postal Code: 15190-000
- Area code: +55 17
- 'HDI (UNDP/2000): 0.806 – high
- Website: Prefecture of Nhandeara

Nhandeara is a municipality in the state of São Paulo, Brazil. The city has a population of 11,527 inhabitants and an area of 435.8 km^{2} (168.3 sq mi).

== History ==
The municipality was created by state law in 1944.

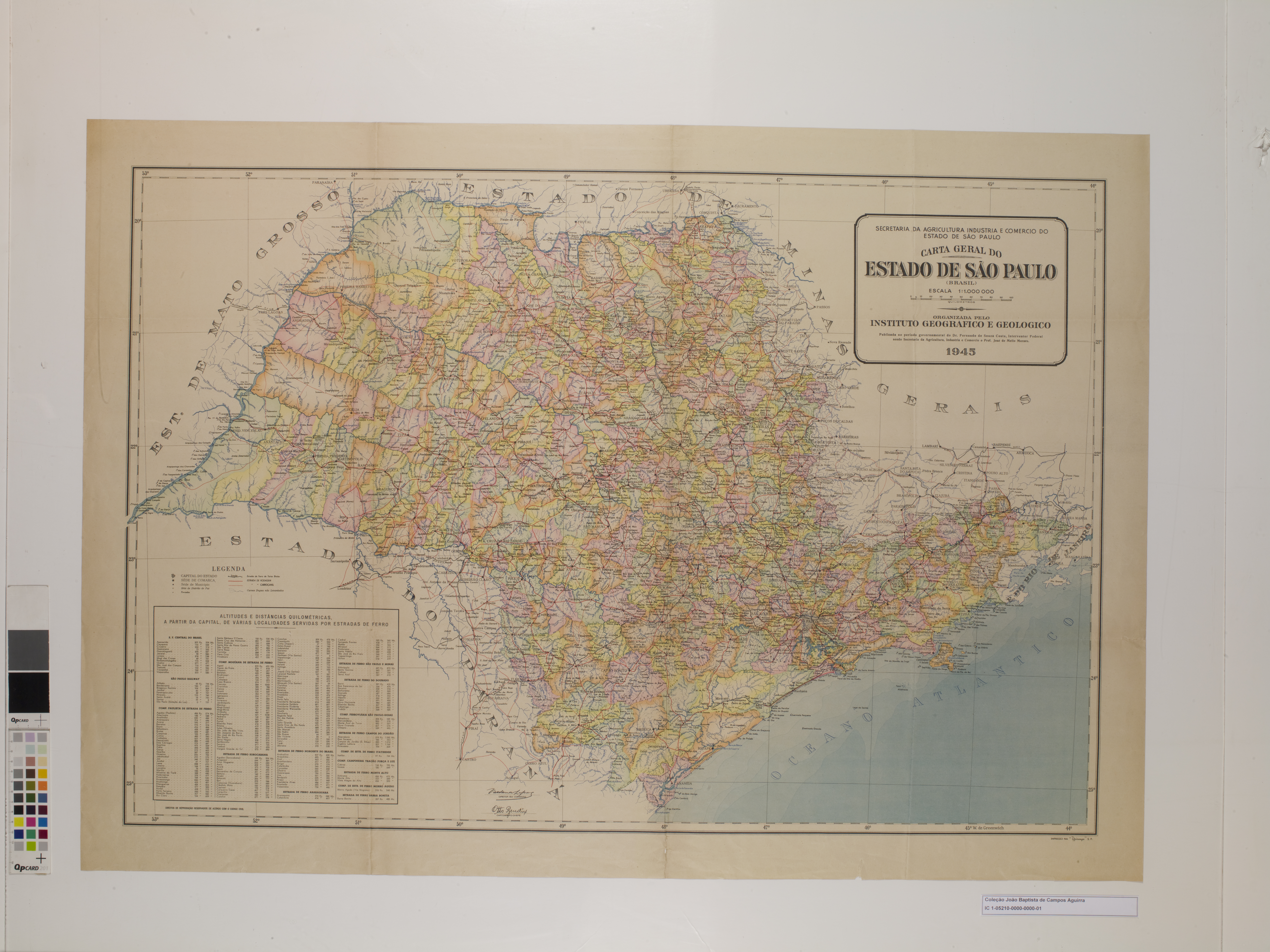
Map of the state of São Paulo (1944).

== Economy ==
The Tertiary sector is the economic basis of Nhandeara. Commerce, services and public administration corresponds to 62.3% of the city GDP. The Secondary sector is 19.4% of the GDP, and the Primary sector corresponds to 18.2%.

== Demographics ==
=== Health ===
- Hospitals: 1

=== Infrastructure ===
- Bank agencies: 4
- Industries: 67
- Commercial establishments: 279
- Services: 161

== Media ==
In telecommunications, the city was served by Companhia de Telecomunicações do Estado de São Paulo until 1975, when it began to be served by Telecomunicações de São Paulo. In July 1998, this company was acquired by Telefónica, which adopted the Vivo brand in 2012.

The company is currently an operator of cell phones, fixed lines, internet (fiber optics/4G) and television (satellite and cable).

== Transportation ==
- SP-310 Rodovia Feliciano Sales Cunha
- SP-461

== See also ==
- List of municipalities in São Paulo
- Interior of São Paulo
