= Tanabi =

- Municipality
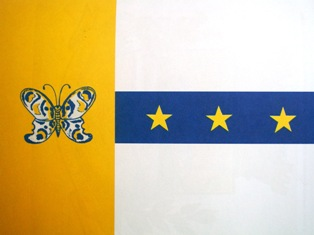
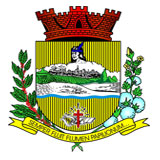
- Flag Coat of arms

- Location of Tanabi
- Coordinates: 20°37′33″S 49°38′56″W
- Country: Brazil
- Region: Southeast
- State: São Paulo
- Established: 2009

Government
  - Mayor: Norair Cassiano Da Silveira

Area
  - Total: 745.8 km^{2} (288.0 sq mi)

Population (2020)
  - Total: 26,101
  - Density: 32.25/km^{2} (83.5/sq mi)
- Time zone: UTC−3 (BRT)
- Postal Code: 15170-000
- Area code: +55 17
- Website: Prefecture of Tanabi

Tanabi is a municipality in the northwestern part of the state of São Paulo, Brazil. The population is 26,101 inhabitants (IBGE/2020). The city is located 447 km from the city of São Paulo and 30 km from São José do Rio Preto. Tanabi was founded on July 4, 1882.

== Demographics ==
Indicators:

- Population: 24,055 (IBGE/2010)
- Area: 745.8 km^{2} (166.5 sq mi)
- Population density: 32.25/km^{2} (2,451.5/sq mi)
- Urbanization: 90.4% (2010)
- Sex ratio (Males to Females): 101.98 (2011)
- Birth rate: 11.59/1,000 inhabitants (2009)
- Infant mortality: 9.9/1,000 births (2009)
- Homicide rate: 6.8/100 thousand ppl
- HDI: 0.817 (UNDP/2000)

All indicators are from SEADE and IBGE

== Economy ==
The tertiary sector corresponds to 64.57% of the GDP. The primary sector is 16.55% of Tanabi's GDP and the industry corresponds to 18,88%.

== Media ==
In telecommunications, the city was served by Telecomunicações de São Paulo. In July 1998, this company was acquired by Telefónica, which adopted the Vivo brand in 2012. The company is currently an operator of cell phones, fixed lines, internet (fiber optics/4G) and television (satellite and cable).

== Transportation ==
- SP-320 - Rodovia Euclides da Cunha
- SP-377 - Rodovia Deputado Bady Bassitt, 16 km to Monte Aprazível

== See also ==
- List of municipalities in São Paulo
- Interior of São Paulo
