= SP-463 (São Paulo highway) =

Sao Paulo's state highway

SP-463

Route information
- Length: 192.000 km (119.303 mi)

Location
- Country: Brazil
- State: São Paulo

Highway system
- Highways in Brazil; Federal; São Paulo State Highways

SP-463 is a state highway in the state of São Paulo in Brazil.
