= Monte Aprazível =

- Municipality
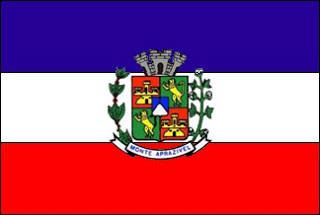
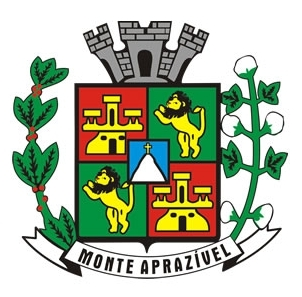
- Flag Coat of arms

- Location of Monte Aprazível
- Coordinates: 20°46′21″S 49°42′51″W
- Country: Brazil
- Region: Southeast
- State: São Paulo
- Mesoregion: São José do Rio Preto
- Established: 2009

Government
  - Mayor: Montoro

Area
  - Total: 496.9 km^{2} (191.9 sq mi)
- Elevation: 475 m (1,558 ft)

Population (2020)
  - Total: 25,373
  - Density: 43.76/km^{2} (113.3/sq mi)
- Time zone: UTC−3 (BRT)
- Postal Code: 15150-000
- Area code: +55 17
- 'HDI (UNDP/2000): 0.808 – high
- Website: Prefecture of Monte Aprazível

Monte Aprazível is a municipality in the state of São Paulo, Brazil. The population is of 25,373 inhabitants, and the area is 496.9 km^{2}.

It is known as "The Dream's Dam City" because of a dam located nearby the city center.

Monte Aprazível belongs to the Mesoregion of São José do Rio Preto and is located 475 km from the city of São Paulo.

== History ==
Monte Aprazível was founded by Captain Porfírio de Alcântara Pimentel, who was born in the city of Areias, São Paulo. On December 18, 1914, the district is created, and on December 23, 1924, the municipality is established with the emancipation from Rio Preto.

== Economy ==
The Tertiary sector and the Industry are the economic basis of Monte Aprazível. Commerce, services and public administration corresponds to 49% of the city GDP. The Secondary sector is 45.5% of the GDP, and the Primary sector corresponds to 5.5%.

== Media ==
In telecommunications, the city was served by Telecomunicações de São Paulo. In July 1998, this company was acquired by Telefónica, which adopted the Vivo brand in 2012. The company is currently an operator of cell phones, fixed lines, internet (fiber optics/4G) and television (satellite and cable).

== Transportation ==
- SP-310 Rodovia Feliciano Sales Cunha
- SP-377 Rodovia Deputado Bady Bassitt

== See also ==
- List of municipalities in São Paulo
- Interior of São Paulo
