= SP-377 (São Paulo highway) =

State highway in São Paulo, Brazil

SP-377

Route information
- Length: 15.520 km (9.644 mi)

Location
- Country: Brazil
- State: São Paulo

Highway system
- Highways in Brazil; Federal; São Paulo State Highways

SP-377 is a state highway in the state of São Paulo in Brazil. It is fractioned in the following sections:

- Bady Bassitt, Representative from () to (): SP-310
- Monte Aprazível: SP-320 (Tanabi)
