= São José do Rio Preto =

Municipality in southeast Brazil

- Municipality
- Municipality of São José do Rio Preto
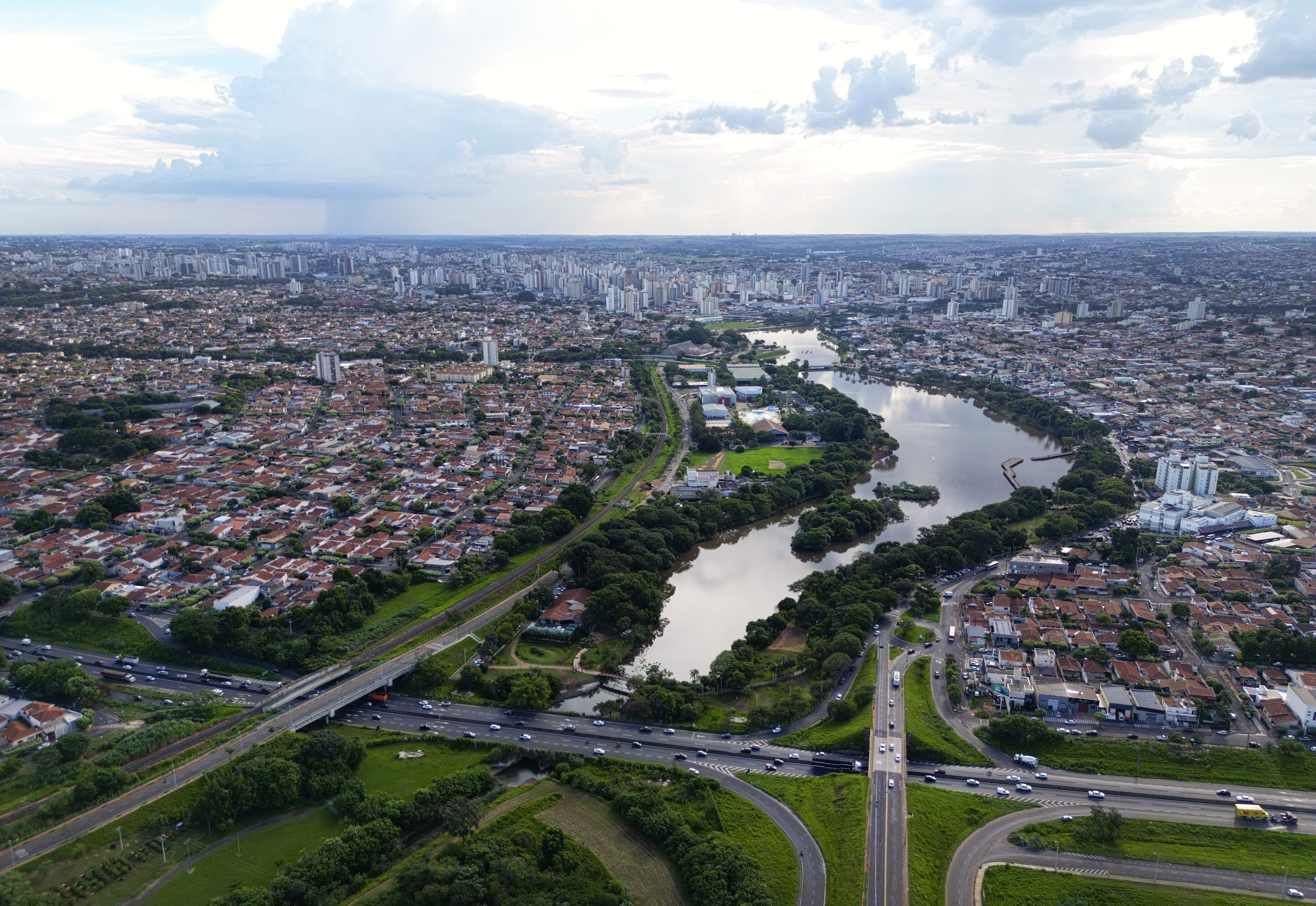
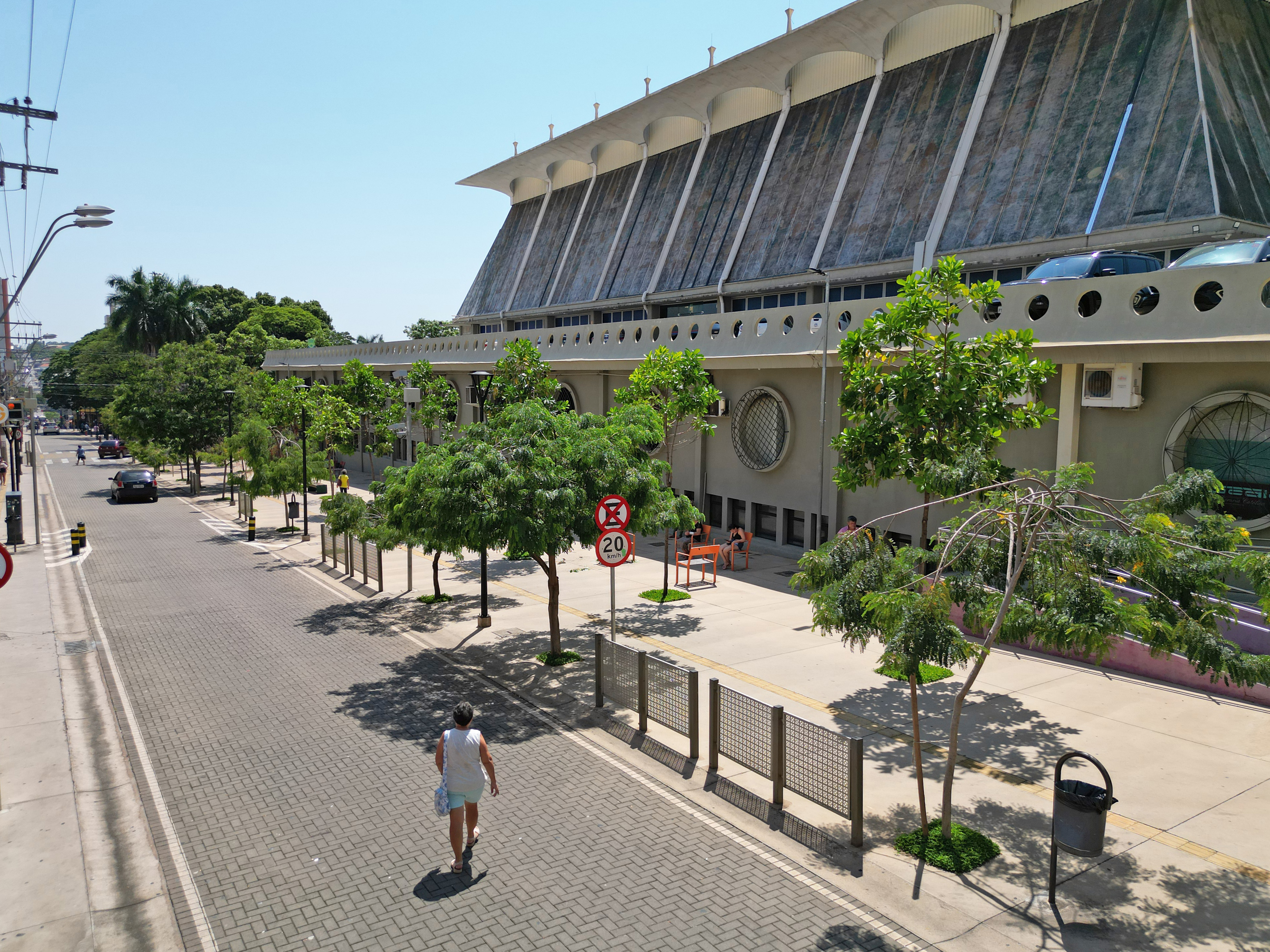
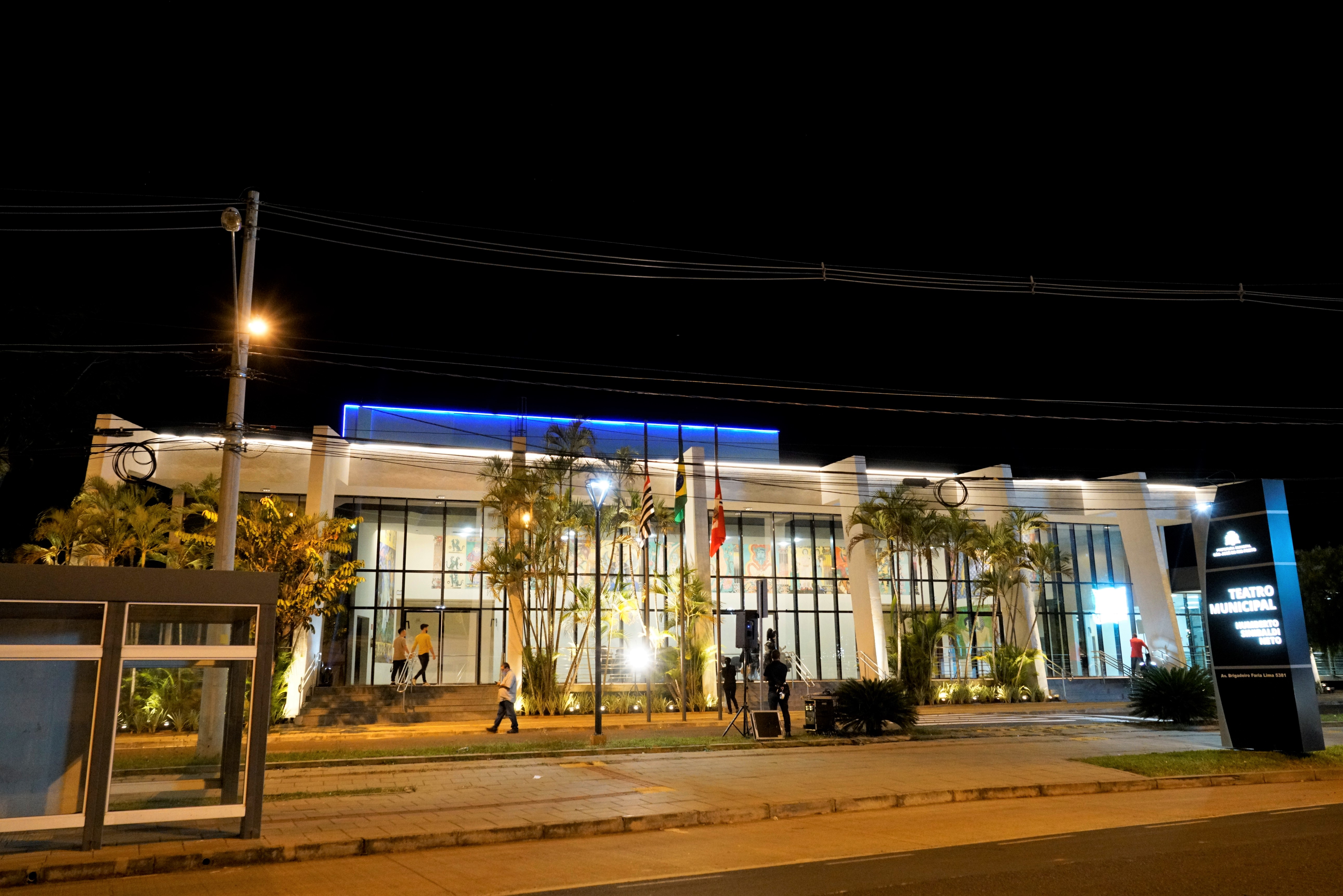
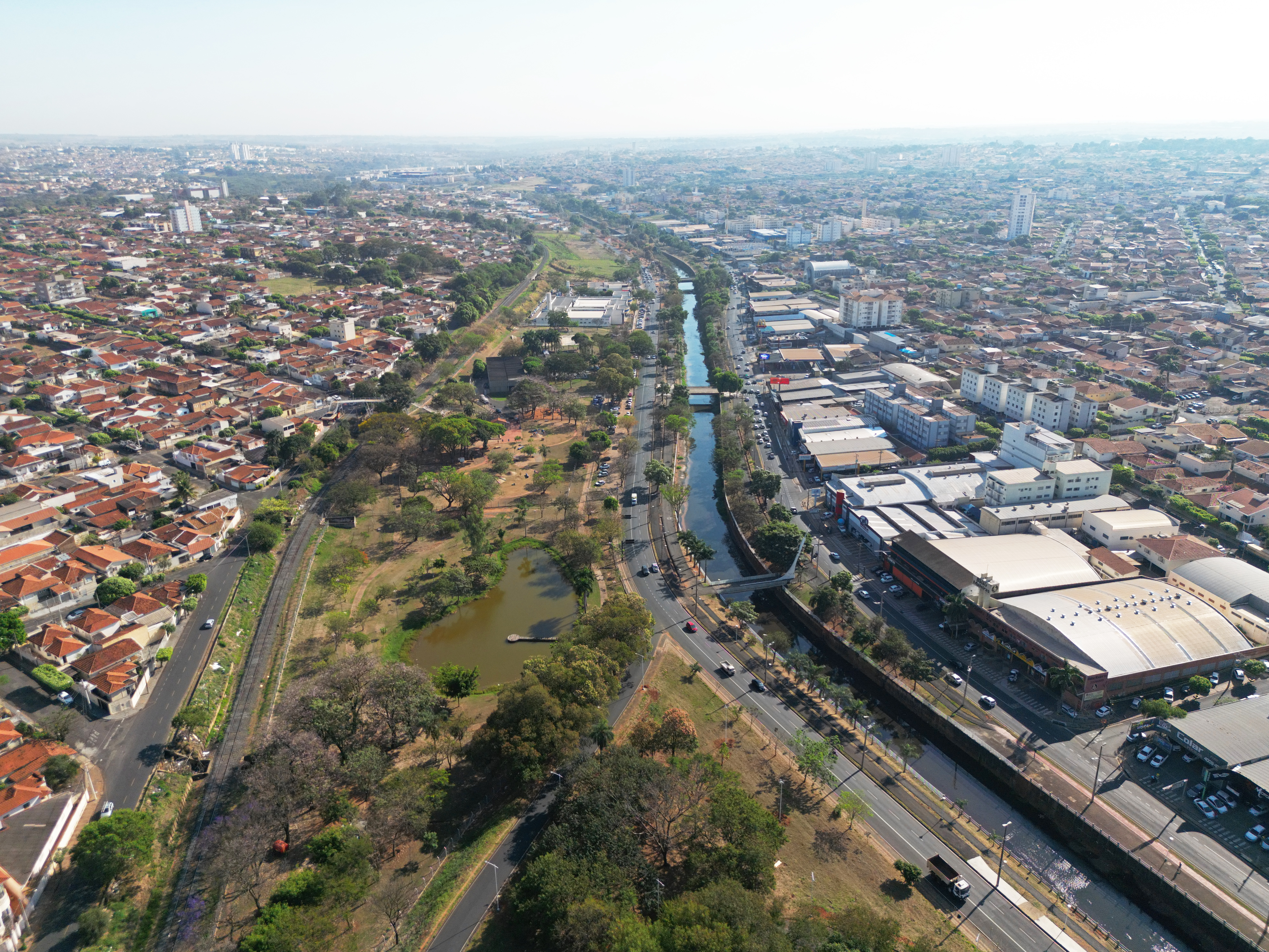
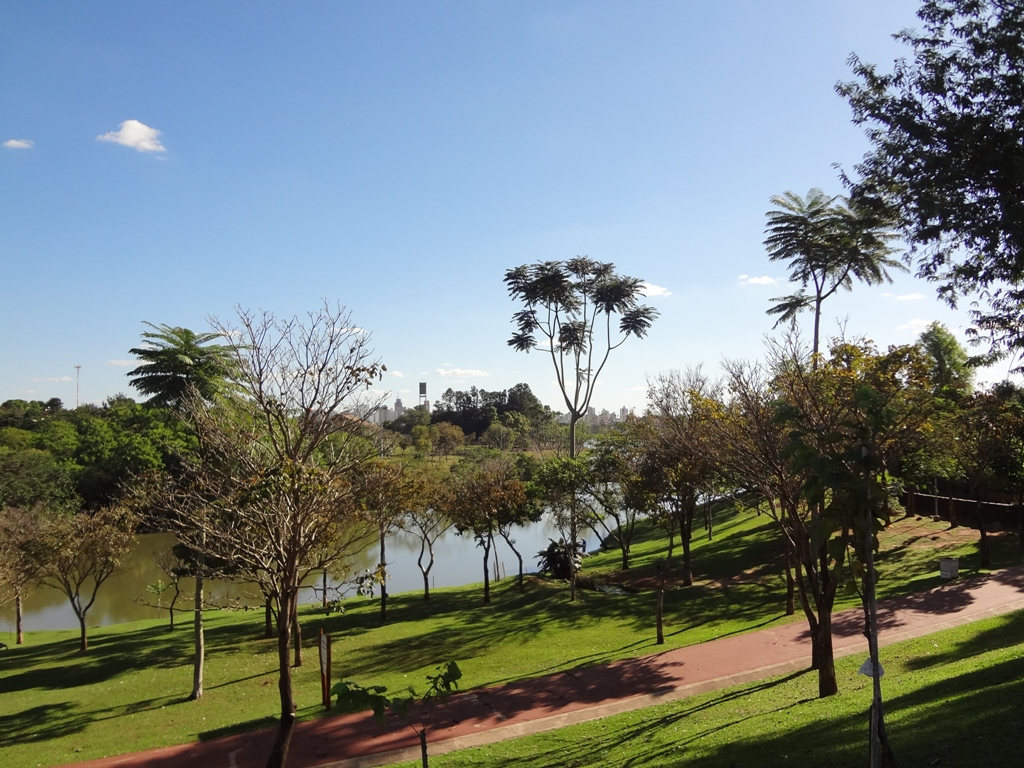
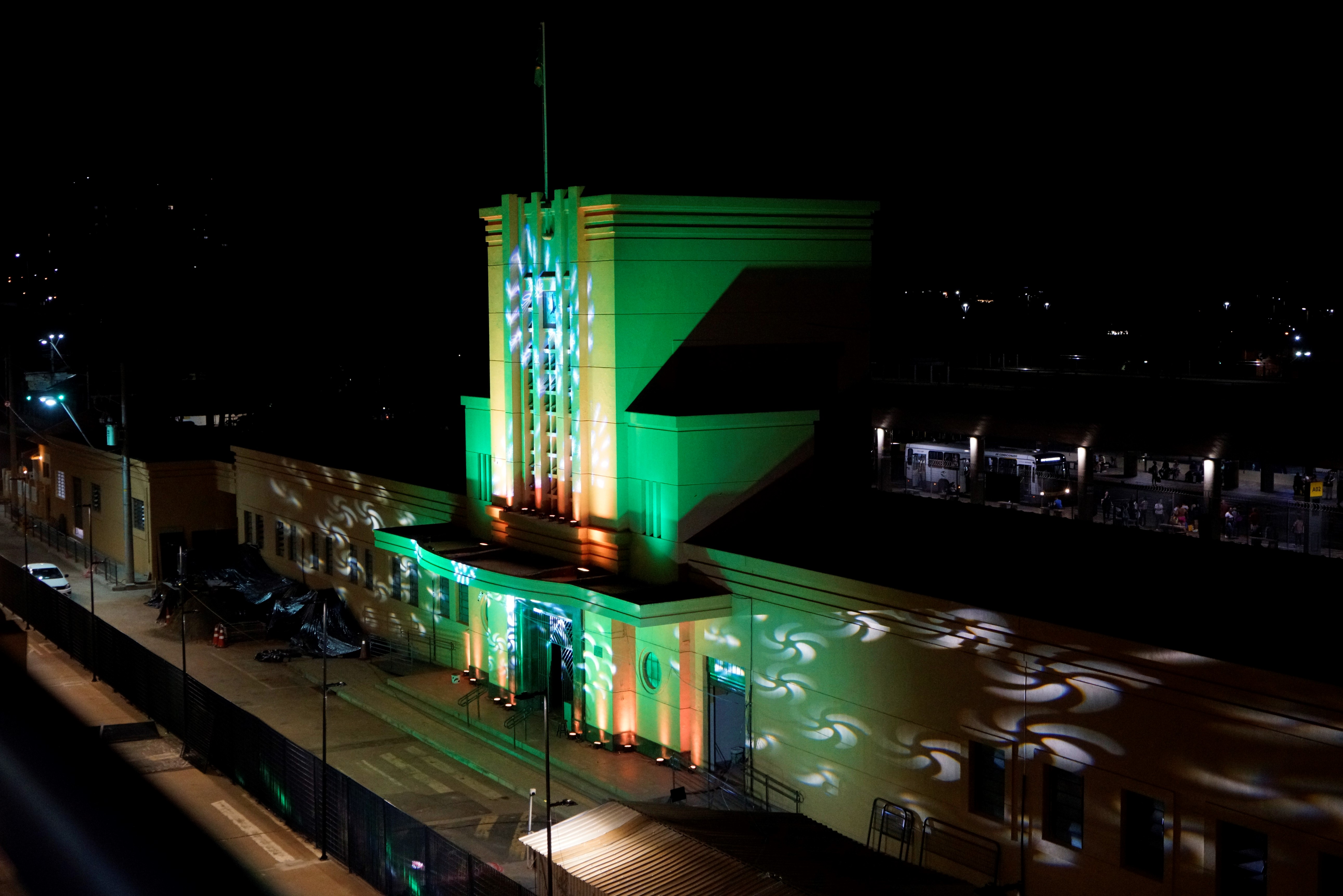
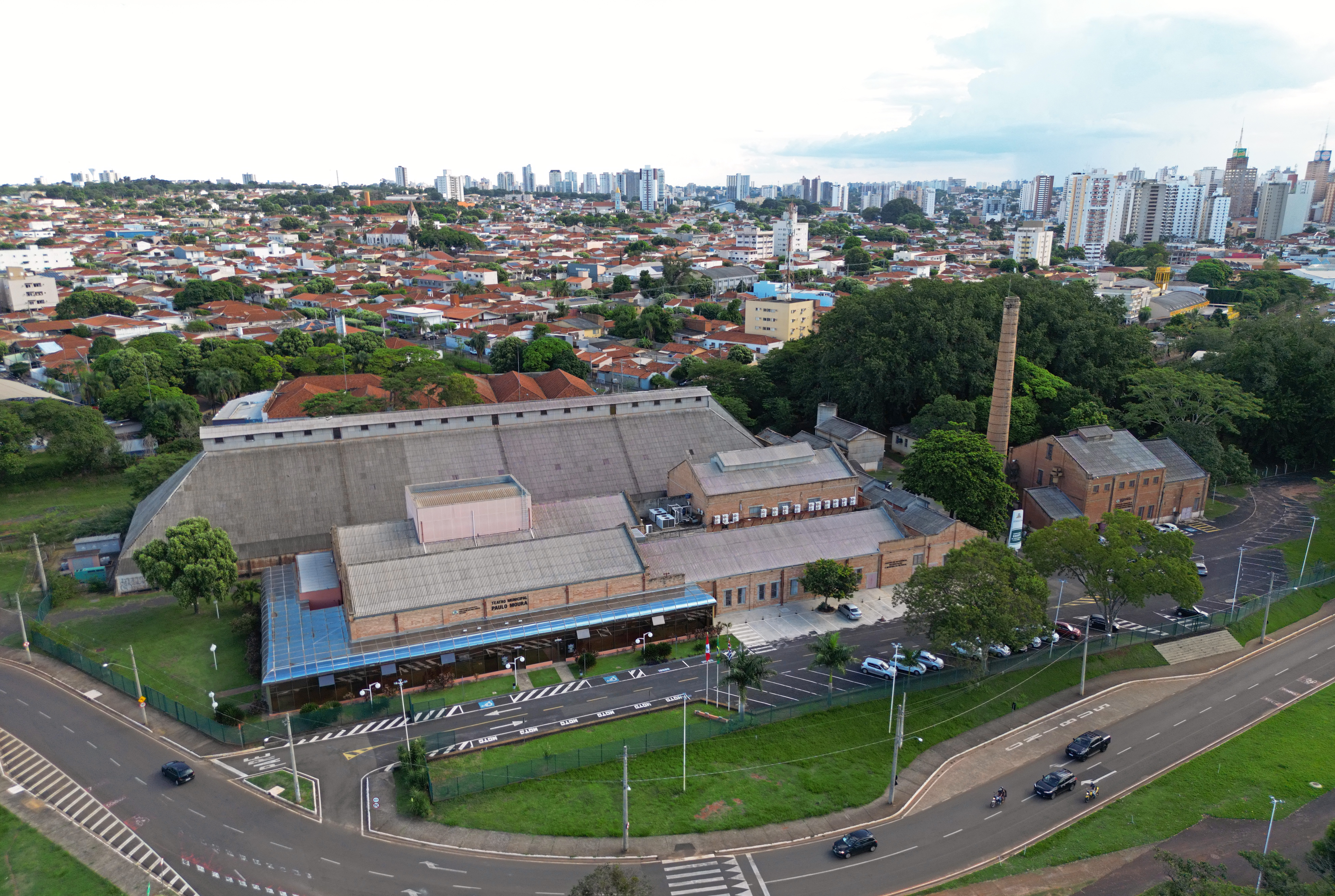
- From top and left to right: Panoramic view of São José do Rio Preto; Metropolitan Cathedral; Humberto Sinibaldi Neto Municipal Theater; Linear Park of the Preto River; Reservoir Park; Railway Museum; Swift Educational and Cultural Complex.

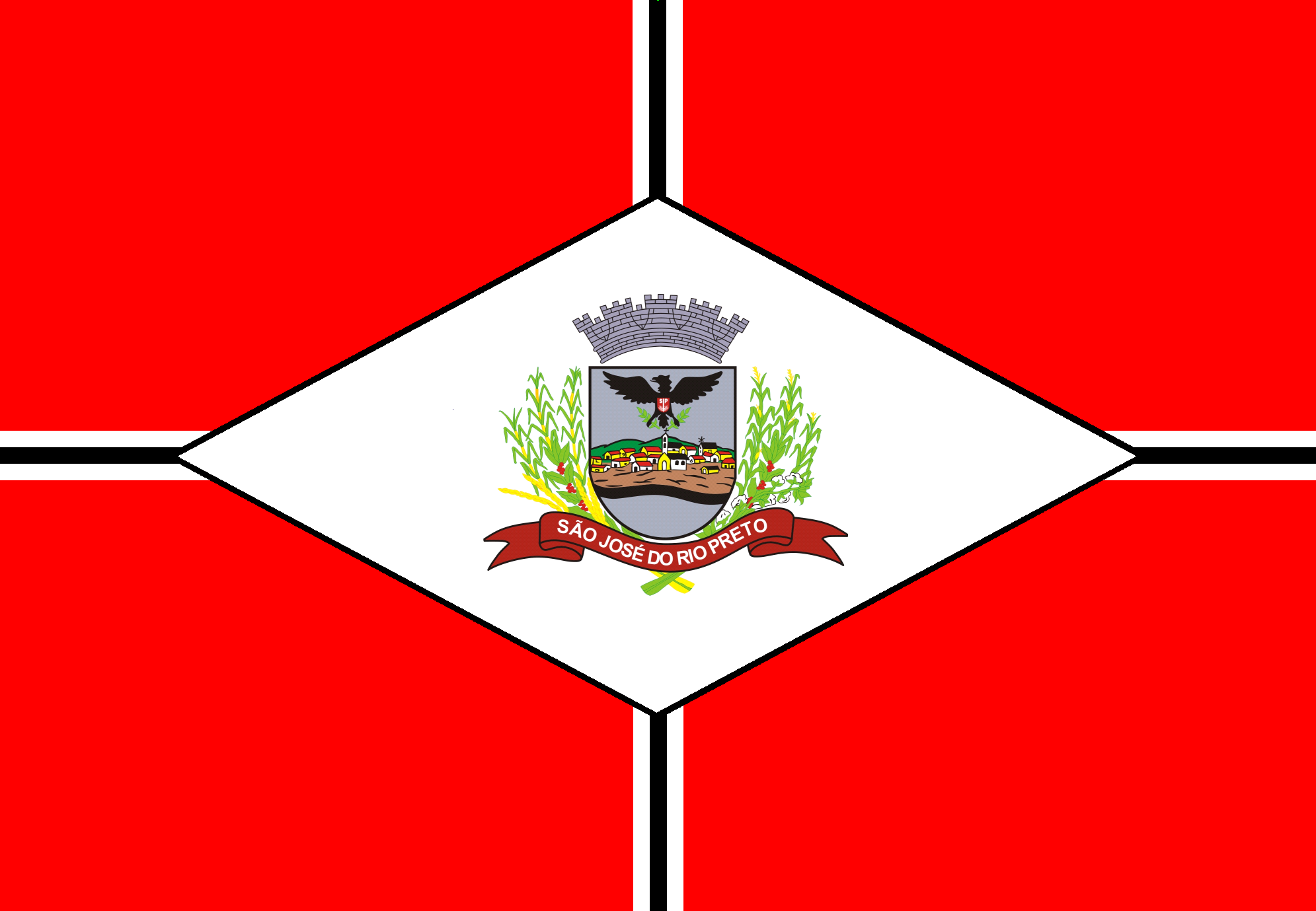
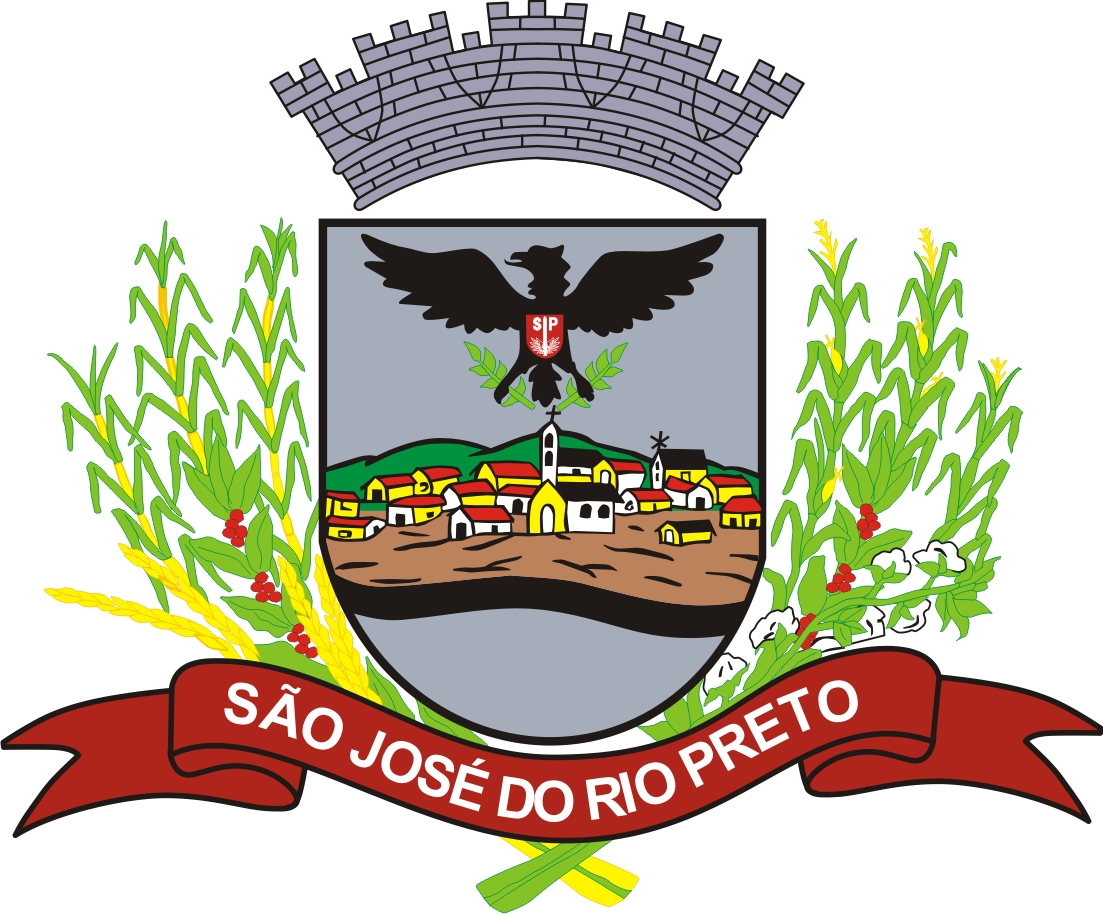
- Flag Coat of arms

- Location in São Paulo
- Coordinates: 20°48′29″S 49°22′52″W
- Country: Brazil
- Region: Southeast
- State: São Paulo
- Mesoregion: São José do Rio Preto
- Founded: March 19, 1852

Government
  - Mayor: Fábio Candido (PL)

Area
  - Municipality: 431.30 km^{2} (166.53 sq mi)
  - Urban: 124.79 km^{2} (48.18 sq mi)
- Elevation: 489 m (1,604 ft)

Population (2025)
  - Municipality: 504,166
  - Density: 1,112.27/km^{2} (2,880.8/sq mi)
- Time zone: UTC-3 (UTC-3)
- Postal Code: 15000-000
- Area code: +55 17
- Demonym: rio-pretense
- HDI: 0.797 – high
- Website: riopreto.sp.gov.br

São José do Rio Preto (Portuguese pronunciation: [sɐ̃w ʒuˈzɛ du ʁiw ˈpɾetu]) is a municipality in the state of São Paulo, Brazil. It is located in the north/northwest region of the state, approximately 445 km (277 mi) from the city of São Paulo and 700 km (430 mi) from Brasília. With a population of 504,166 inhabitants, by the 2025 estimative of the IBGE, it is the 10th largest city in São Paulo and the 48th largest in Brazil. It has an area of 431.30 km^{2}; the urban area, with 124.79 km^{2}, is the 7th largest in the state and the 30th largest in the country. By the 2022 IBGE census, the city had a population of 480,383 inhabitants, with a population density of 1,112.7 people/km^{2}.

The Metropolitan Region of São José do Rio Preto, with 1,010,633 inhabitants in 2025, is the 30th largest metropolitan area in Brazil, according to the IBGE. In 2020, the Mesoregion of São José do Rio Preto had a population of 1,569,220; the Microregion of São José do Rio Preto had a population of 763,534.

The city was founded in 1852 and elevated to municipality in 1894 and has an economic history closely tied to the tertiary sector and the primary sector. São José do Rio Preto celebrates its anniversary on March 19, Saint Joseph's Day.

== History ==
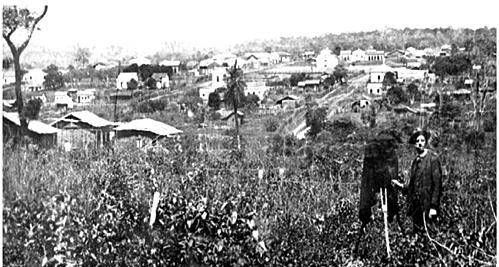
São José do Rio Preto in 1909.

Prior to the 19th century, the region of São José do Rio Preto was inhabited by the Kaingang indigenous people. Over time, their numbers gradually declined as a result of migration, exploratory expeditions known as "bandeiras" and miscegenation with other groups.

The city was established on March 19, 1852, by João Bernardino de Seixas Ribeiro, a migrant from Minas Gerais. Luiz Antônio da Silveira, a local farmer, generously contributed a portion of his land to establish the new city as a tribute to the patron saint, Saint Joseph.

The municipality of São José do Rio Preto was officially founded in 1894 and the territory ceased to be a part of Jaboticabal; it was a large territory, limited by the rivers Paraná, Grande, Tietê and Turvo, comprising approximately 26,000 km^{2} of land.

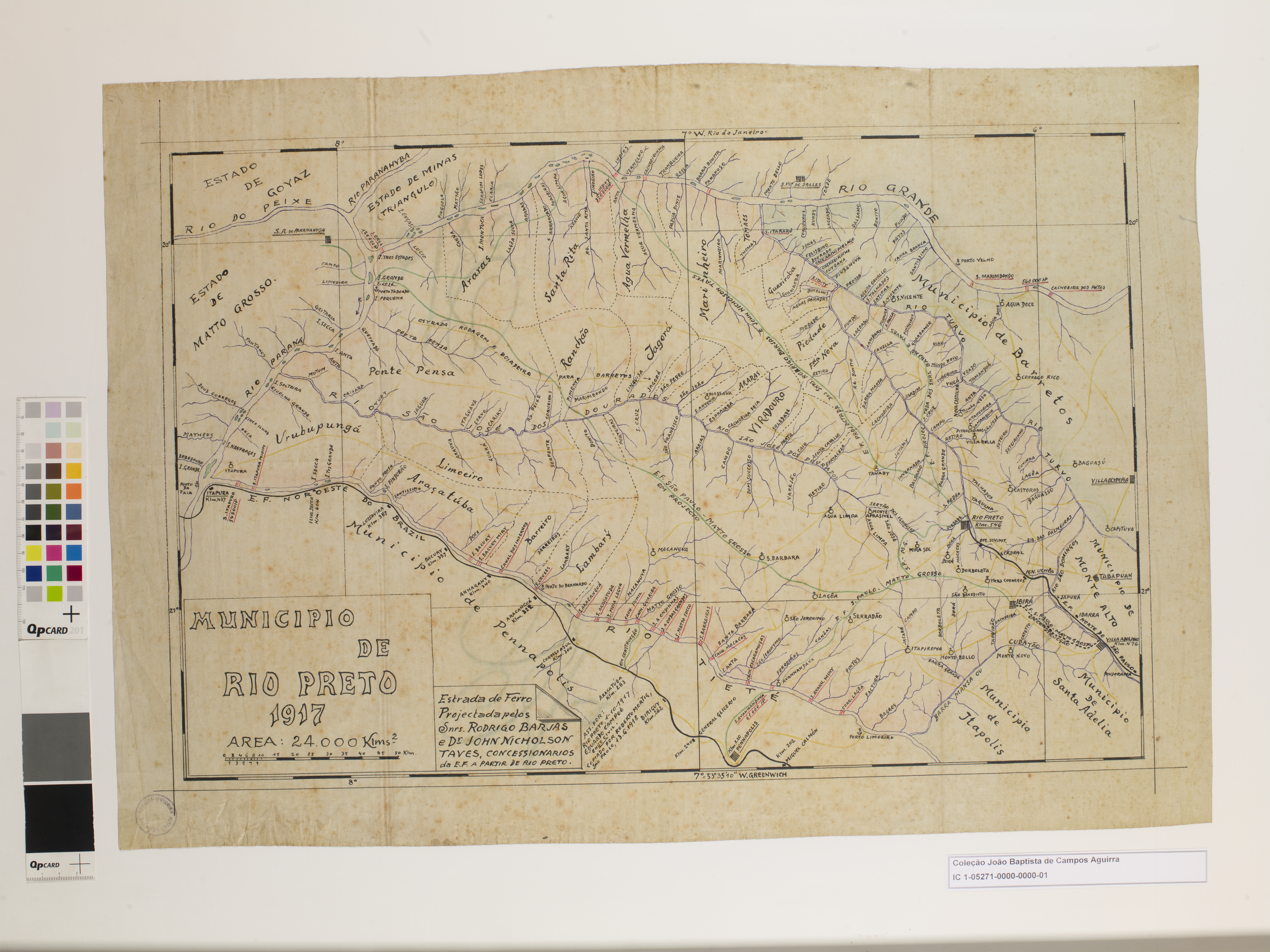
Map of the city of Rio Preto in 1917.

The railway reached the city in 1912, following the expansion of the Araraquarense Railway (Estrada de Ferro Araraquara). After the completion, the railway played a crucial role in the development of the city; it transformed the city into a terminal point of railroad transport, of people abroad and agricultural products of Rio Preto and neighboring cities, turning Rio Preto, in 1929, into a growing urban core with circa 27,800 inhabitants

Between 1906 and 1944, the city was known by the toponym Rio Preto; in 1944, a proposal was made to change the name of the city to Iboruna, meaning "Black River" in the Tupi language, but the proposal was not approved.

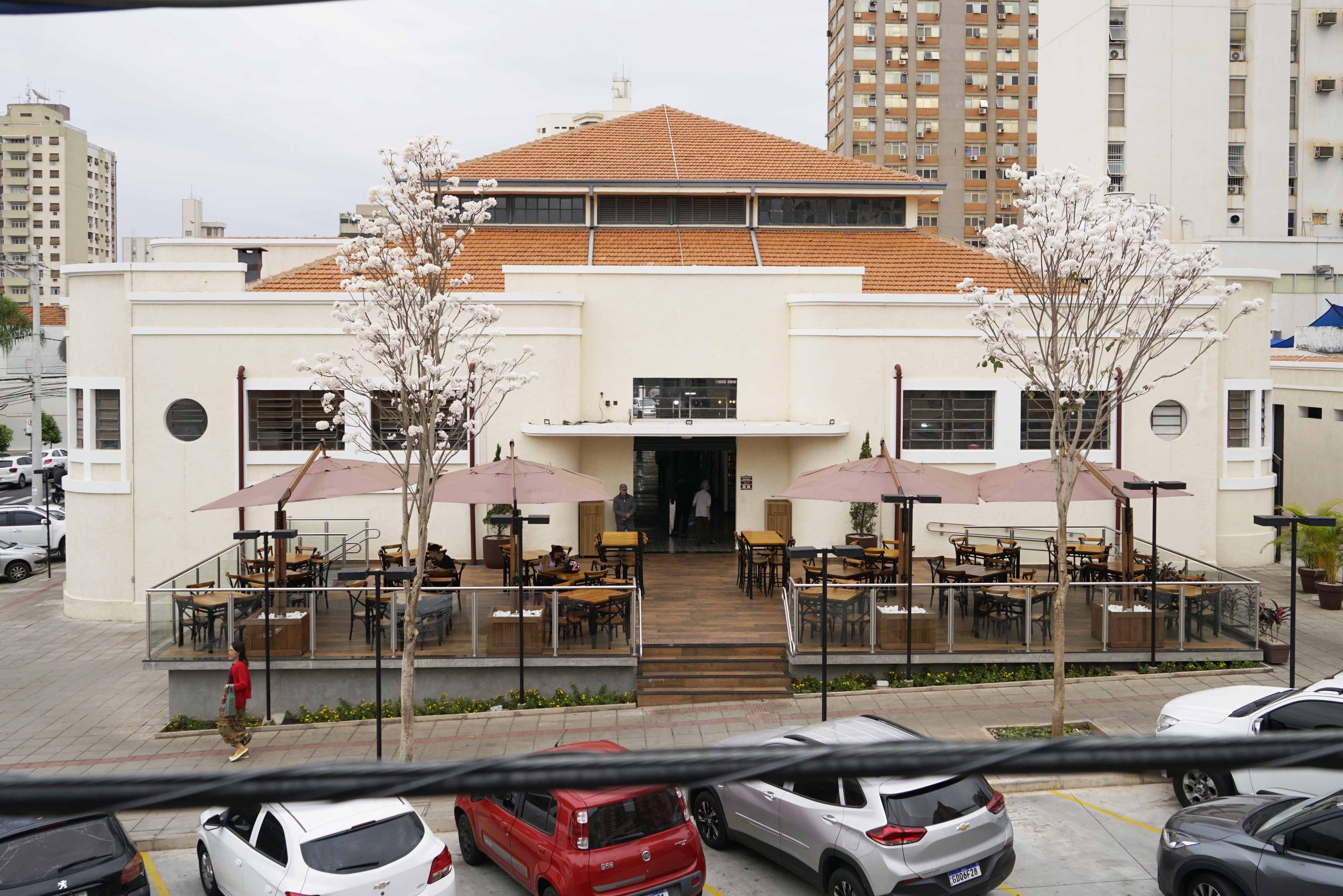
Municipal Market, inaugurated in 1944.

In 1943, the Dr. Fernando Costa Municipal Public Library was inaugurated and on July 19, 1944, the Municipal Market was inaugurated, still in operation. In January 1973, the Humberto Sinibaldi Neto Municipal Theater was inaugurated; also in 1973, the construction of the new Cathedral of Saint Joseph began, now the seat of the Archdiocese of São José do Rio Preto.

On July 19, 1980, in the second term of mayor Adail Vetorazzo, the actual building of the Dr. Fernando Costa Municipal Public Library was inaugurated.

=== Toponym ===
The name São José do Rio Preto is derived from the combination of the words "São José" (Saint Joseph) and "Rio Preto" (Black River), which translates literally as "Saint Joseph of the Black River". Saint Joseph is the city's patron saint and the Preto is the major river that runs through the city.

== Geography ==
São José do Rio Preto is located in the north/northwest part of the state of São Paulo in a region between the rivers Grande, Paraná and Tietê. The ecological makeup of the region blends elements of the Cerrado (Brazilian savanna) with remnants of the Atlantic Forest. In terms of topography, the area is characterized by gently rolling hills, with an average elevation of 489 m (1,604 ft).

=== Parks ===
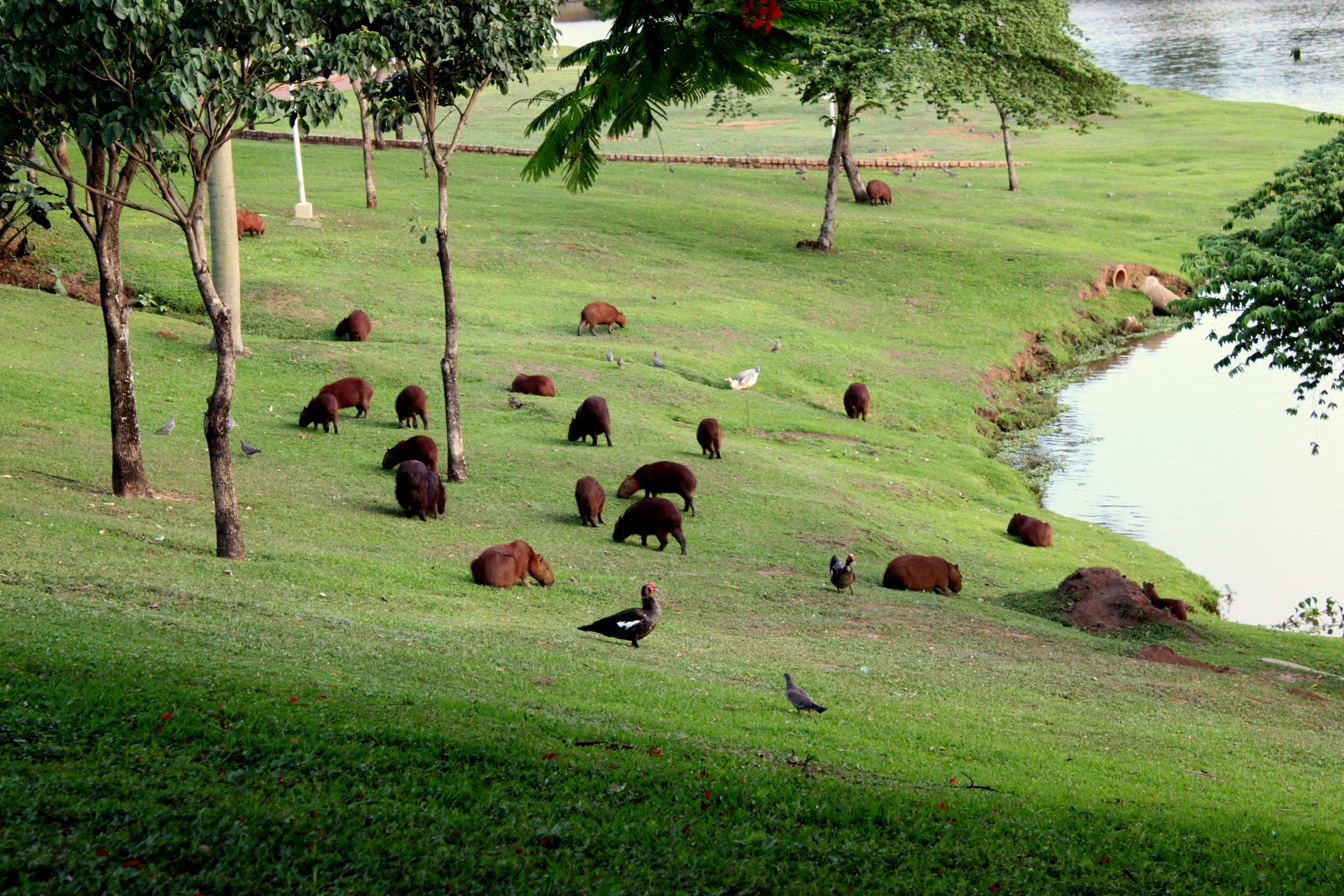
Capybaras and other animals at the Reservoir Park.

The São José do Rio Preto Reservoir Park is located at the eastern part of the city. It was established in 1955 with the aim of enhancing the water supply and conserving the natural environment along the banks of the Rio Preto. In 2011, new walking tracks and bike tracks were added, spanning the entire length of the park. Presently, the park boasts over 10,000 native species of local fauna, as well as kiosks and free outdoor gym equipment.

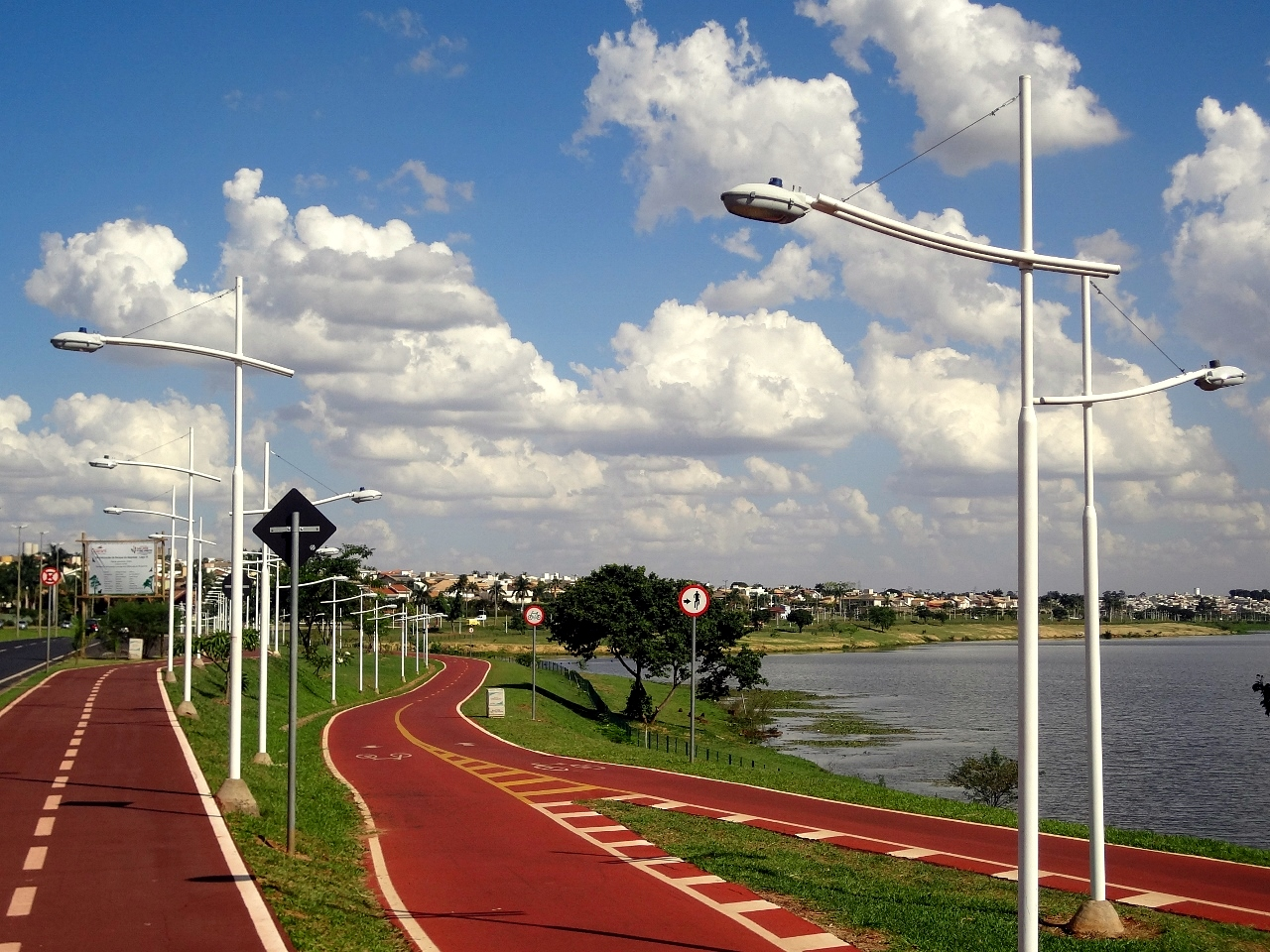
Third lake of the Reservoir Park.

The city has two educational ecological parks: the Educational Ecological Park “Danilo Santos De Miranda” and the Educational Ecological Park “Dr. Joaquim de Paula Ribeiro”, wooded areas with walking tracks, children's playgrounds, focused on the appreciation and integration of the environment, leisure and[education.

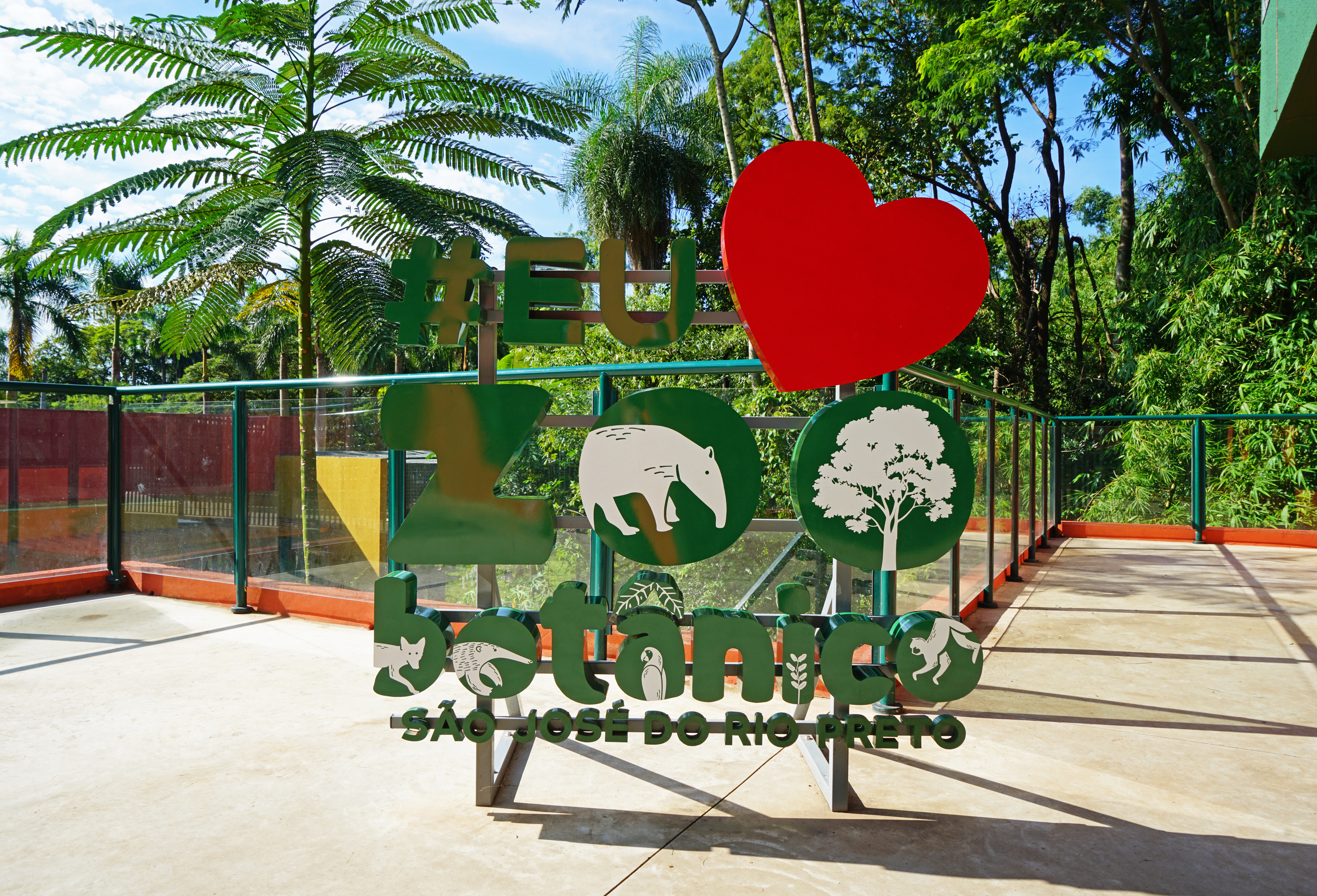
Municipal Zoo of São José do Rio Preto.

The Municipal Zoo, Zoobotânico Municipal, founded in 1973, counts with a native forest reserve and a zoo with approximately 300 animals of 70 species in an urban area of 14 hectares with remnants of Atlantic Forest and Cerrado vegetation; it safeguards wild animals that are victims of trafficking, run overs and fires, as well as fostering orphaned cubs.

São José do Rio Preto is the third city with the highest urban afforestation rate in Brazil; 97.78% of the city's inhabitants lives on streets with trees, according to the 2022 IBGE census.

=== Climate ===
The climate in São José do Rio Preto is classified as tropical (Aw), characterized by hot and rainy summers, as well as mild and dry winters.

The average annual temperature is around 23 °C (73 °F). The city typically receives an average annual precipitation ranging from 1,300 to 1,500 mm (51 to 59 in). In 2008, the recorded rainfall reached 1,593 mm (62.7 in).

Climate data for São José do Rio Preto, elevation 486 m (1,594 ft), (1994–2010 normals, extremes 1993–2014)
Month	Jan	Feb	Mar	Apr	May	Jun	Jul	Aug	Sep	Oct	Nov	Dec	Year
Record high °C (°F)	40.0 (104.0)	41.0 (105.8)	39.0 (102.2)	37.0 (98.6)	35.0 (95.0)	36.0 (96.8)	35.0 (95.0)	37.0 (98.6)	41.0 (105.8)	42.0 (107.6)	41.0 (105.8)	41.0 (105.8)	42.0 (107.6)
Mean daily maximum °C (°F)	32.1 (89.8)	32.6 (90.7)	32.3 (90.1)	31.5 (88.7)	27.9 (82.2)	27.2 (81.0)	27.8 (82.0)	30.6 (87.1)	31.9 (89.4)	33.1 (91.6)	32.8 (91.0)	32.6 (90.7)	31.0 (87.9)
Daily mean °C (°F)	26.8 (80.2)	27.2 (81.0)	26.8 (80.2)	25.6 (78.1)	22.0 (71.6)	21.0 (69.8)	21.1 (70.0)	23.3 (73.9)	25.1 (77.2)	26.6 (79.9)	26.7 (80.1)	26.9 (80.4)	24.9 (76.9)
Mean daily minimum °C (°F)	21.6 (70.9)	21.7 (71.1)	21.3 (70.3)	19.8 (67.6)	16.0 (60.8)	14.7 (58.5)	14.4 (57.9)	16.1 (61.0)	18.4 (65.1)	20.2 (68.4)	20.6 (69.1)	21.2 (70.2)	18.8 (65.9)
Record low °C (°F)	15.0 (59.0)	16.0 (60.8)	13.0 (55.4)	7.0 (44.6)	6.0 (42.8)	3.0 (37.4)	0.5 (32.9)	6.4 (43.5)	6.0 (42.8)	11.6 (52.9)	10.0 (50.0)	12.0 (53.6)	0.5 (32.9)
Average precipitation mm (inches)	336.0 (13.23)	209.9 (8.26)	164.0 (6.46)	65.7 (2.59)	60.7 (2.39)	28.0 (1.10)	17.2 (0.68)	23.5 (0.93)	56.6 (2.23)	94.2 (3.71)	139.5 (5.49)	216.5 (8.52)	1,411.8 (55.59)
Average precipitation days (≥ 1.0 mm)	16.0	12.0	10.8	5.2	3.8	2.4	1.4	2.0	4.6	6.8	9.0	13.9	87.9
Source: Centro Integrado de Informações Agrometeorológicas

=== Neighbor Cities ===
- North: Ipiguá and Onda Verde
- South: Cedral and Bady Bassitt
- East: Guapiaçu
- West: Mirassol

=== Districts ===
- Southeast side: Engenheiro Schmitt
- Northeast side: Talhado

== Economy ==
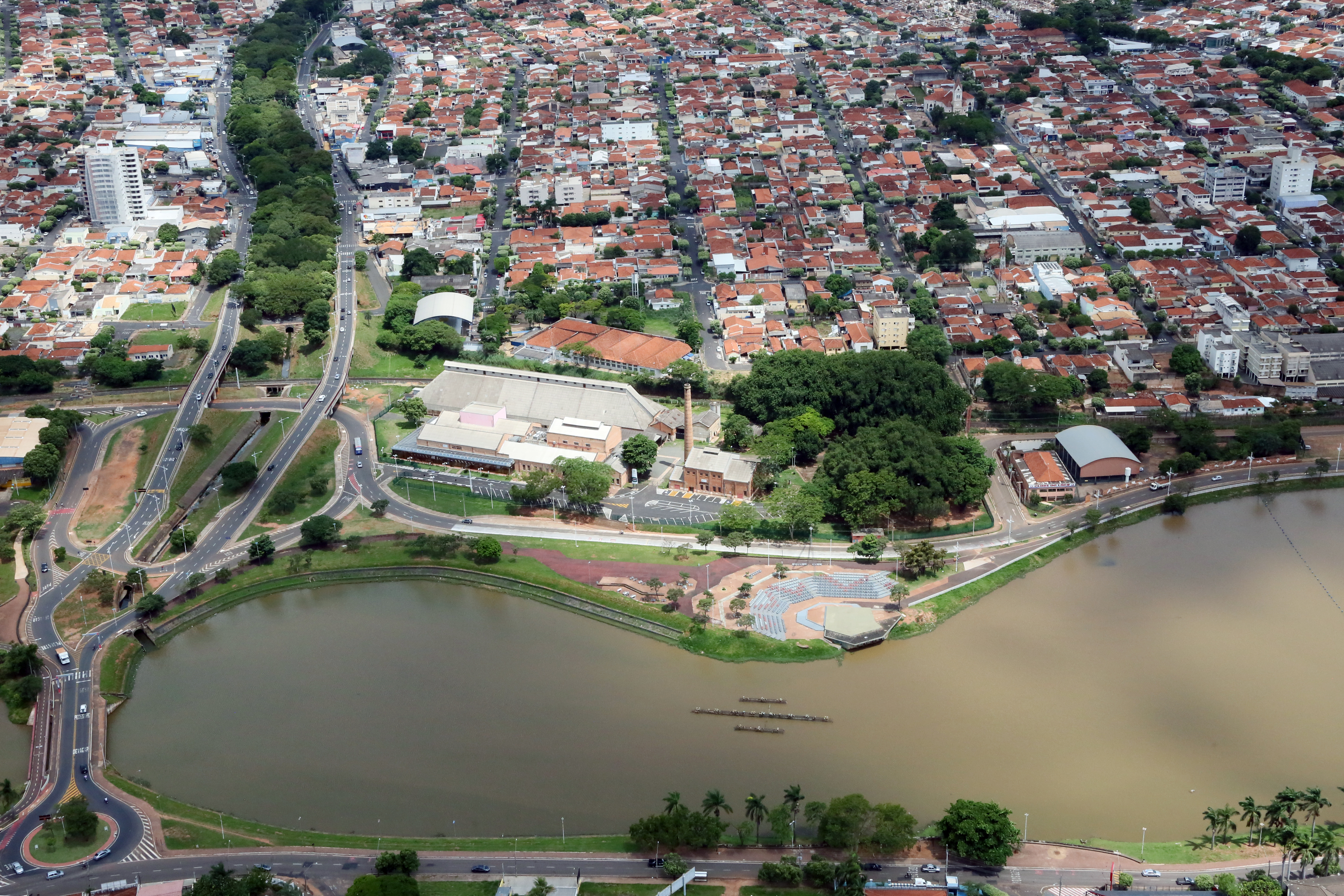
Swift, old historic factory, now a cultural and educational center.

The tertiary sector is the main sector of the economy of São José do Rio Preto, representing 84,53% of the total income; the secondary sector corresponds to 15,19%. The primary sector have a small portion of the GDP, accounting for less than 1%. The primary agricultural products in the city includes sugarcane, rubber, oranges, and maize.

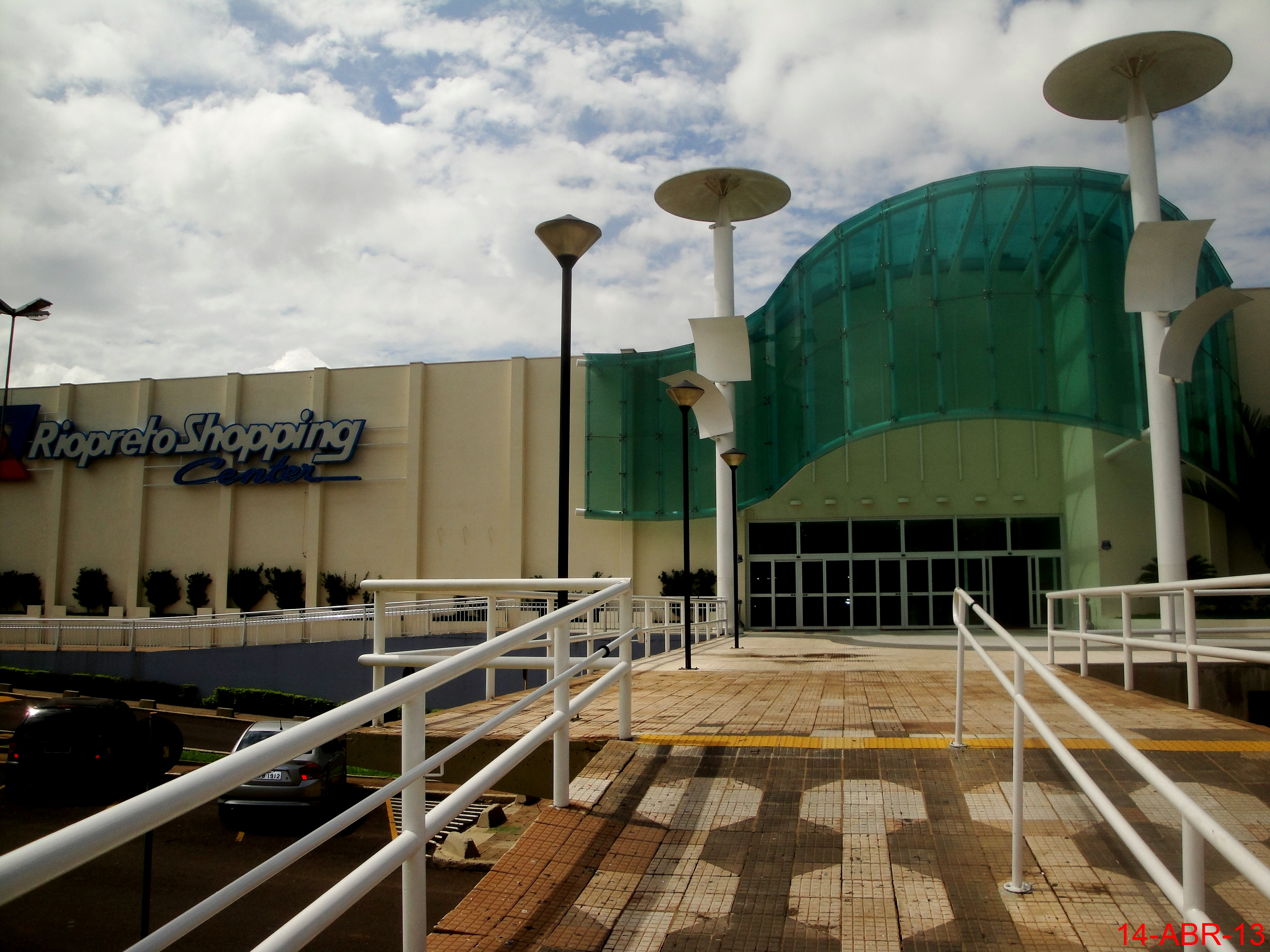
Riopreto Shopping Center.

In 2021, the GDP of São José do Rio Preto reached R$20.9 billion, with R$14.5 billion from the tertiary sector, R$2.1 billion from the secondary sector, R$64.1 million from the primary sector and R$1.8 billion from public administration. From January to October 2025, exports totaled US$54.9 million (R$300.3 million), a 35% increase compared to 2024.

Being a services and commerce center, São José do Rio Preto has five shopping malls: Riopreto Shopping Center, inaugurated in 1988, Praça Shopping, inaugurated in 1998, Plaza Avenida Shopping, inaugurated in 2007, Shopping Cidade Norte, inaugurated in 2012 and Shopping Iguatemi, inaugurated in 2014.

The industrial complex of the city comprises three industrial districts and thirteen mini-districts, with the primary employers being small and medium-sized businesses.

The Technological Park Vanda Karina Simei Bolçone was inaugurated in 2018 and is specialized in the areas of health, biotechnology, agribusiness and design.

== Demographics ==
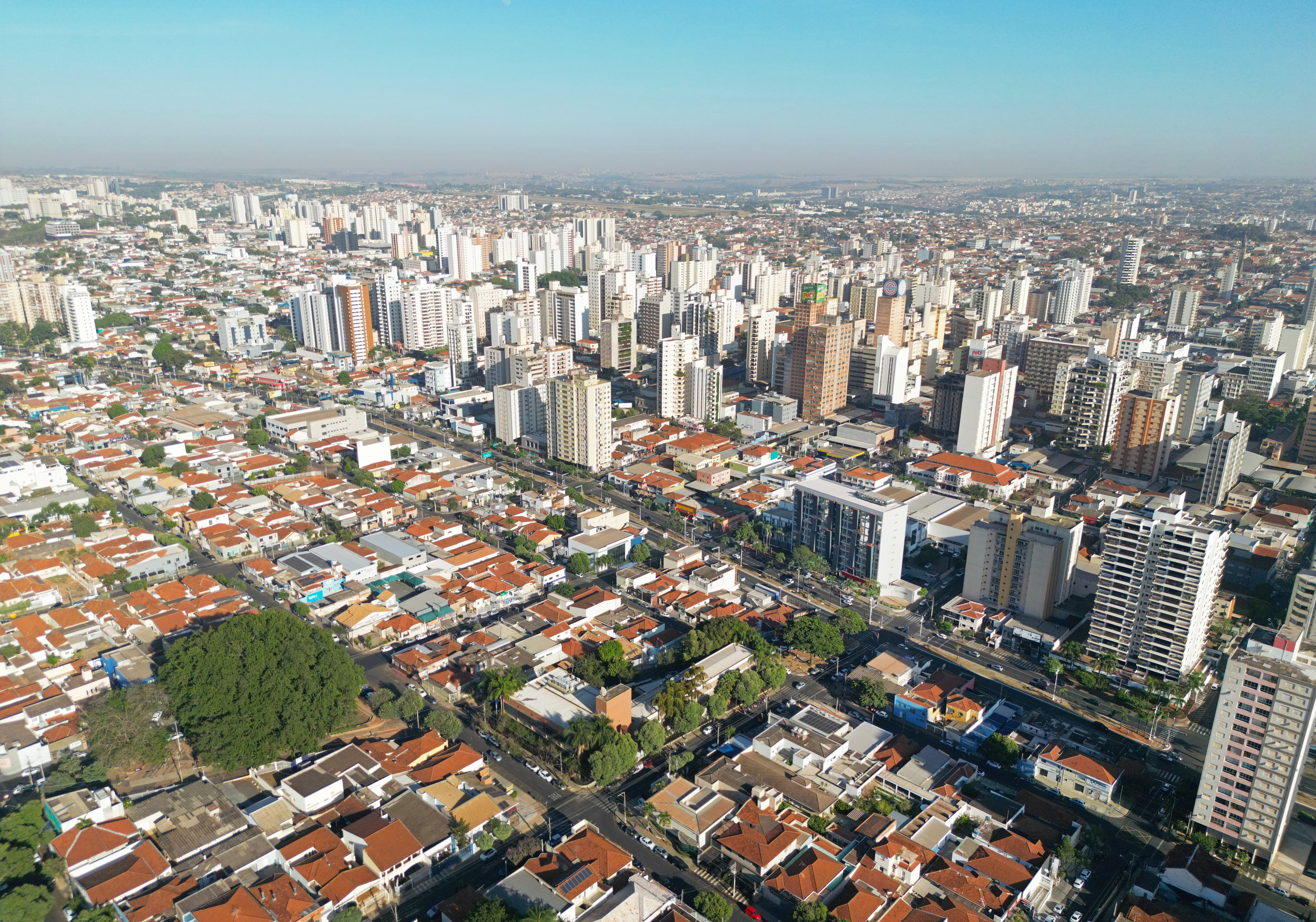
Downtown of São José do Rio Preto.

Historical population (municipality)
Year	Population	%±
1920	126,796
1940	74,359	−41.4%
1950	65,852	−11.4%
1960	84,039	27.6%
1970	122,134	45.3%
1980	188,599	54.4%
1991	283,761	50.5%
2000	358,523	26.3%
2010	408,258	13.9%
2022	480,393	17.7%

According to the Brazilian Human Development Index (HDI), São José do Rio Preto was classified as having a high level of development in 2010, with a value of 0.797. This ranking places it at the 50th position out of 5,565 municipalities in Brazil, and 27th out of 645 municipalities in the state of São Paulo. In 2025, according to the Firjan Municipal Development Index, São José do Rio Preto was the 8th most developed city in Brazil and the 4th most developed in the state of São Paulo.

=== Indicators ===
- Total Population: 504,166 (IBGE/2025)
- Number of Households: 220,173 (IBGE/2022)
- Area: 431.31 square kilometers (166.53 square miles)
- Urban Area: 124.79 square kilometers (48.18 square miles) (IBGE/2019)
- Population Density (IBGE/2022):1,112.57 people per square kilometer (2,881.5 people/mi^{2})
- Urbanization Rate: 99.2% (IBGE/2022)
- Sex Ratio (Males to Females): 91.26 (IBGE/2022)
- Birth Rate: 12.63 per 1,000 inhabitants (2011)
- Infant Mortality Rate: 7.11 per 1,000 births (2011)
- Literacy Rate: 97.8% (IBGE/2022)
- Median Age: 37 years (IBGE/2022)
- Number of Vehicles: 442,700 (IBGE/2024)

=== Ethnicities ===
According to the IBGE census of 2022, 67.53% of the population was White, 25.67% was Mixed, 5.88% was Black, 0.85% was Asian and 0.06% was Indigenous.

Around 45% of the population of São José do Rio Preto are descendants of Italians who came to the region from the end of the 19th century, around 1880. Since then, the presence of the Italian culture has marked the life of the region and its roots can be seen in the names of streets and neighborhoods, in customs, in language, in religion, in art and the gastronomy.

=== Religion ===
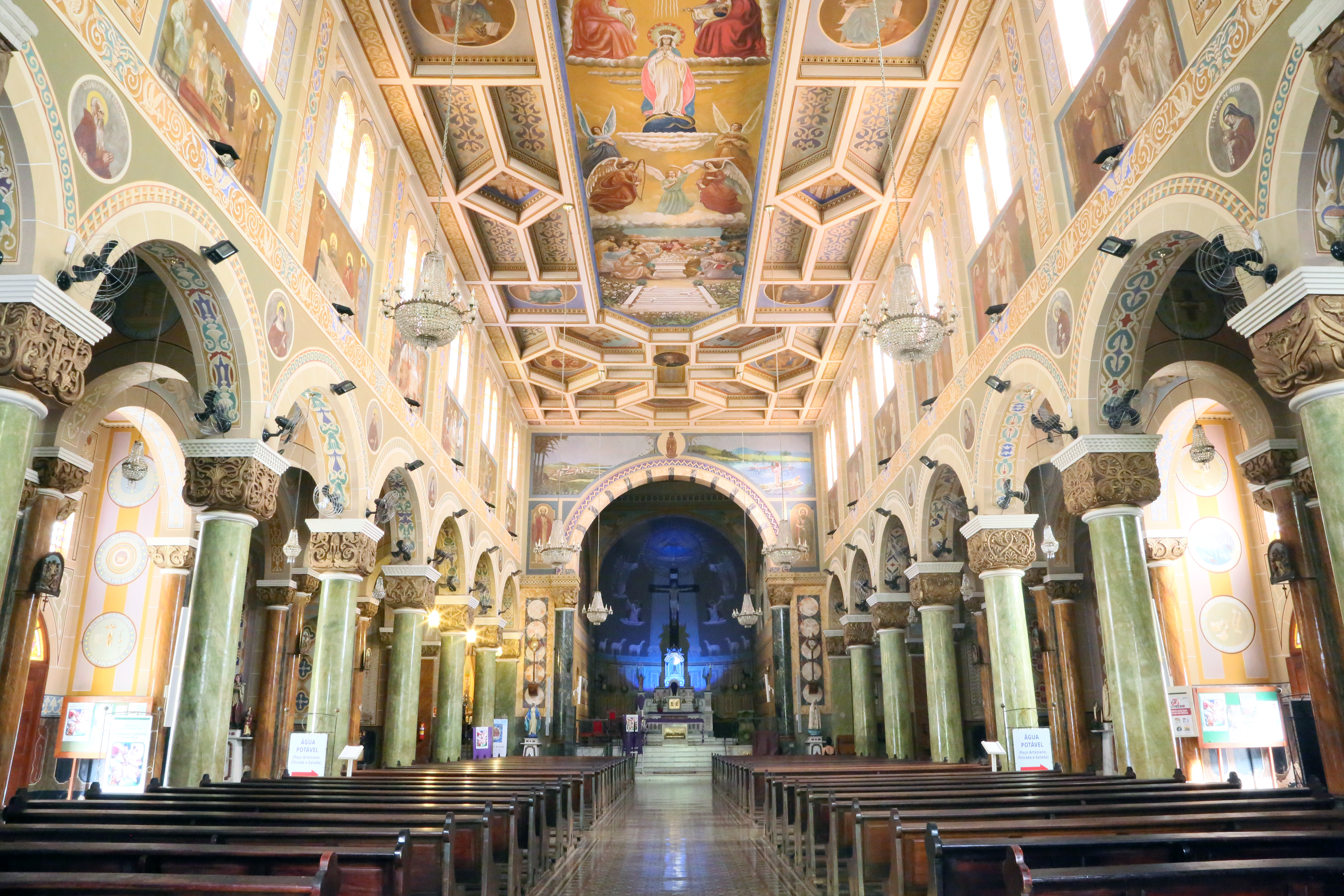
Basilica Church of Our Lady of the Immaculate Conception of Aparecida.

The city is home to the archdiocese of São José do Rio Preto, created a metropolitan archdiocese by Pope Leo XIV on May 22, 2025. The diocese is a heritage site situated at the same location where the first chapel was built in 1852. The cathedral serves as the epicenter of the city and houses various artworks, including a sculpture of Saint Joseph dating back to the 19th century.

According to the 2010 census, the city's population consists of the following religious affiliations: Roman Catholics (58.7%), Brazilian Protestants (23.79%), Spiritists (6.81%), individuals with no religious affiliation (5.57%), Jehovah's Witnesses (1.47%), Atheists (0.38%), members of the Church of Jesus Christ of Latter-day Saints (0.18%), Buddhists (0.18%), practitioners of Umbanda and Candomblé (0.17%), Eastern Orthodox Christians (0.07%), and Jews (0.03%).

=== Public Security ===
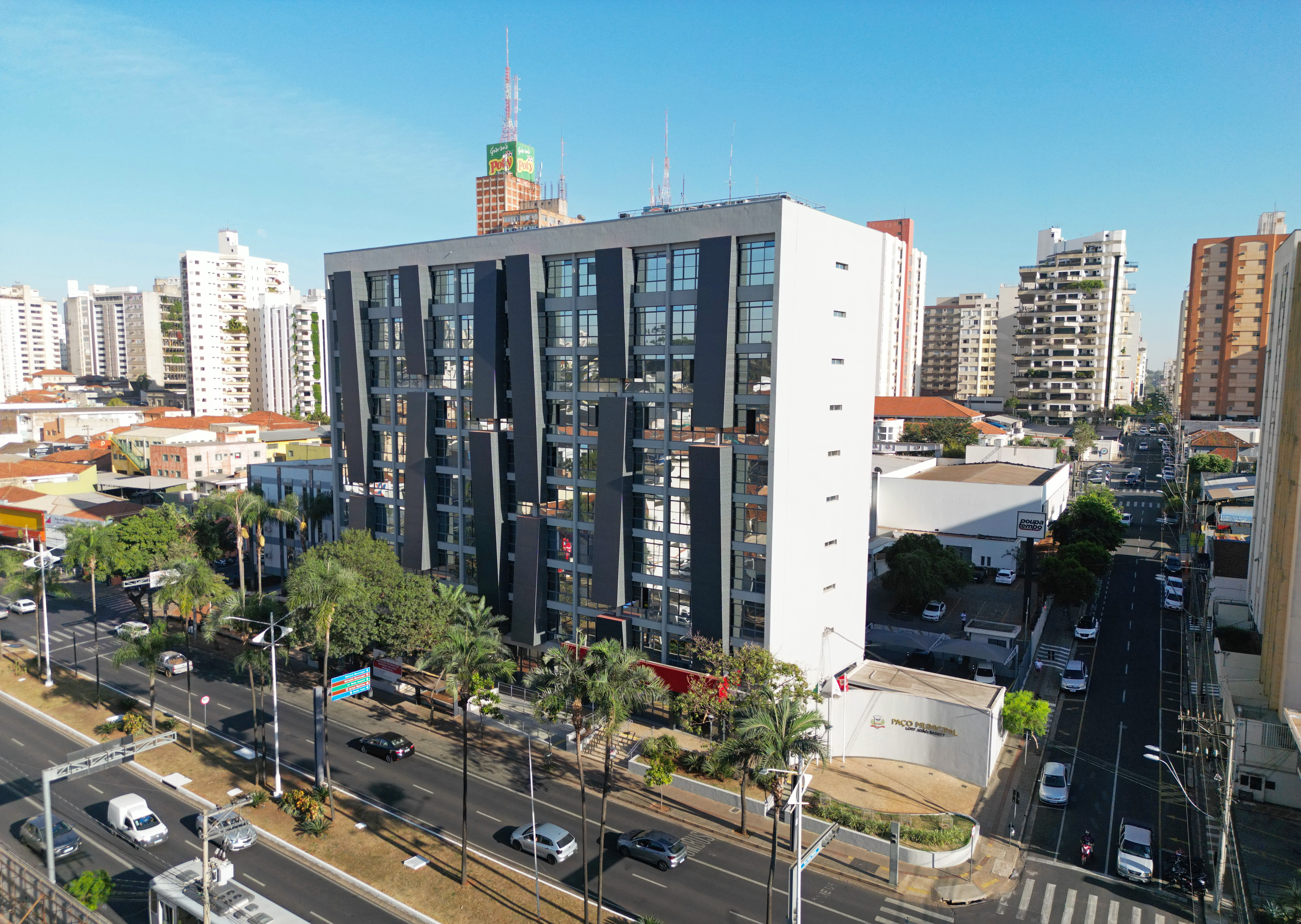
City Hall.

In 2018, São José do Rio Preto experienced its highest number of homicides in 16 years, with 45 recorded murders compared to 47 in 2002. The following year, in 2019, the number of homicides decreased to 24 but then increased to 30 in the subsequent year. On the other hand, the number of robberies saw a slight decrease in 2020, with 968 reported cases compared to 1,258 in the previous year.

== Infrastructure ==
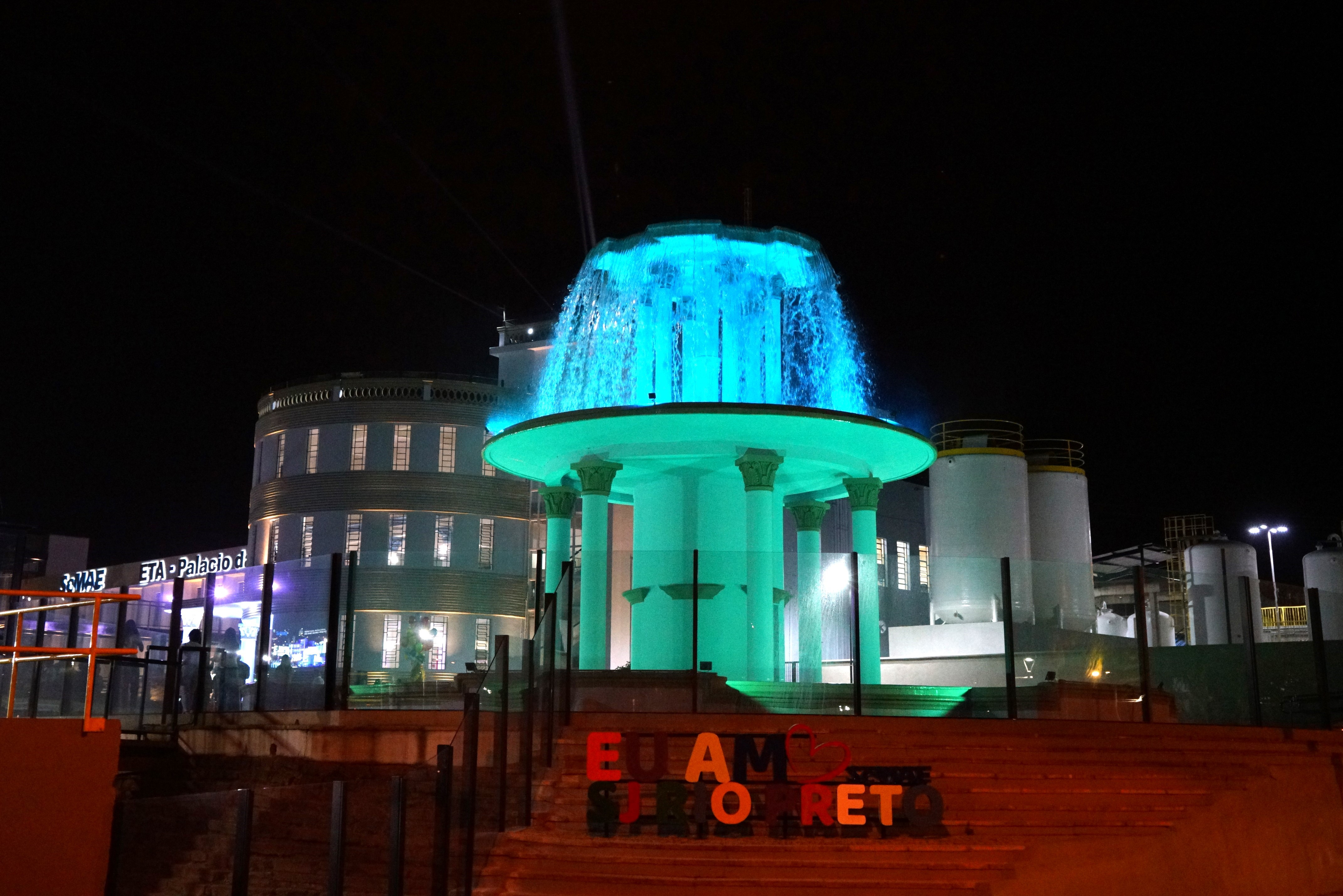
Water Treatment Plant.

According to the IBGE census of 2022, São José do Rio Preto had 220,173 households with an average number of residents per household of 2.57 people; by the same census, 99.97% of the households had bathrooms, 95.42% had connection to the sewage network, 99.86% had waste collection and 91.38% had Internet access. In 2023, according to a study by the Instituto Trata Brasil, São José do Rio Preto had the best sanitation between de 100 largest cities in Brazil, including 100% of the population with access to treated water. The city treats 100% of the collected sewage.

São José do Rio Preto has no favelas. The city's last substandard settlement was Favela Marte, which was restructured and urbanized through a pioneering project in Brazil that replaced shacks without infrastructure with 239 homes for 743 people and inaugurated in 2024 with complete infrastructure.

=== Health ===
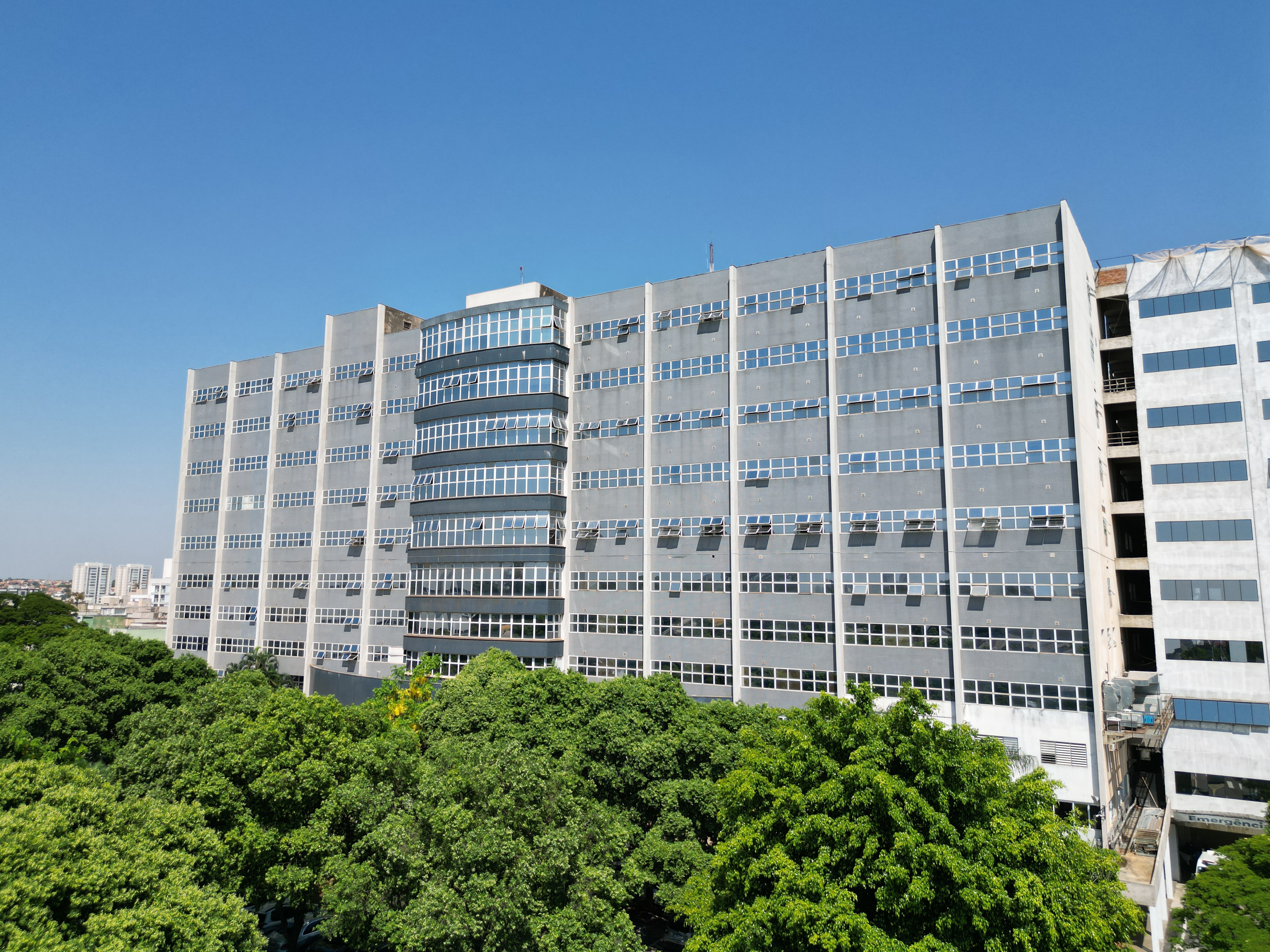
Base Hospital.

The city's main public hospital is the Hospital de Base (Base Hospital), the second largest hospital in the state of São Paulo and one of the largest in Brazil. The hospital complex has 8,800 employees, including 1,082 physicians, 641 residents in 48 specialties, 3,689 nursing professionals and 3,388 professionals from various health, administrative, and support areas. The institution has 1,318 beds, 1,048 of which are in the ward and 268 in the ICU, in addition to the largest surgical center in the interior of São Paulo, with 46 rooms for highly complex procedures and robotic surgeries. Additionally, catering specifically to the healthcare needs of children, the Hospital da Criança e Maternidade (HCM) was established in 2013 and is located next to the Hospital de Base, standing as the largest pediatric hospital in Brazil, with 255 beds. Other public hospitals are the Santa Casa de Misericórdia de São José do Rio Preto, the Municipal Hospital Dr. Domingo Marcolino Braile and the State Hospital João Paulo II.

The private hospitals of the city are the Beneficência Portuguesa, that has a heliport, the Austa Hospital, the Hospital Santa Helena and the Hospital Rio Preto Hapvida.

=== Education ===
In 2018, primary schools in São José do Rio Preto reported a total enrollment of 48,200 students, while secondary schools recorded 15,335 enrollments. The year 2017 witnessed a total of 27,352 enrollments in higher education institutions.

The city is supported by a network of 36 public schools and 51 private schools, providing education from preschool to secondary levels. Furthermore, the municipality operates 153 public schools, including elementary, middle, and high schools.

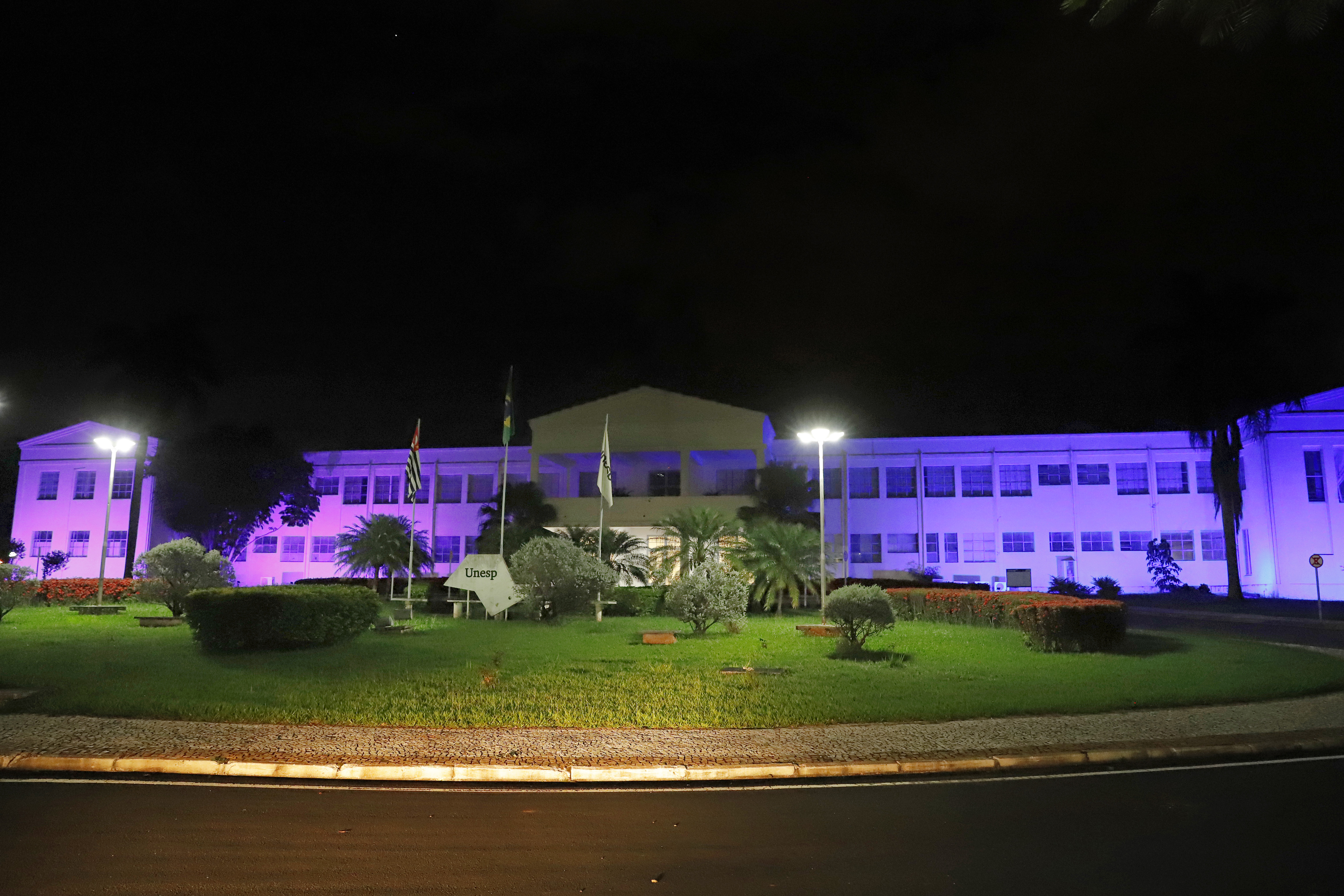
São Paulo State University (UNESP).

São José do Rio Preto is also home to two public universities, UNESP (IBILCE), specialized in biosciences, languages and exact sciences and FAMERP, specialized in medicine and nursing. It has a campus of the FATEC, which offers programs in technology. The city has a campus of the Federal Institute of Education, Science and Technology. From 2026, São José do Rio Preto will have a campus of the Federal University of São Carlos with nine courses.

Additionally, the city houses a number of private universities, like UNIP, UNIRP, Faceres, UNORTE and UNILAGO.

== Transportation ==
=== Rail ===
The old railway station, inaugurated in 1912 and deactivated in 2001, became the Railway Museum in 2024. Now the railway line is only used for the transportation of cargo. Rumo Logística currently operates the freight transport services in São José do Rio Preto.

=== Bus ===
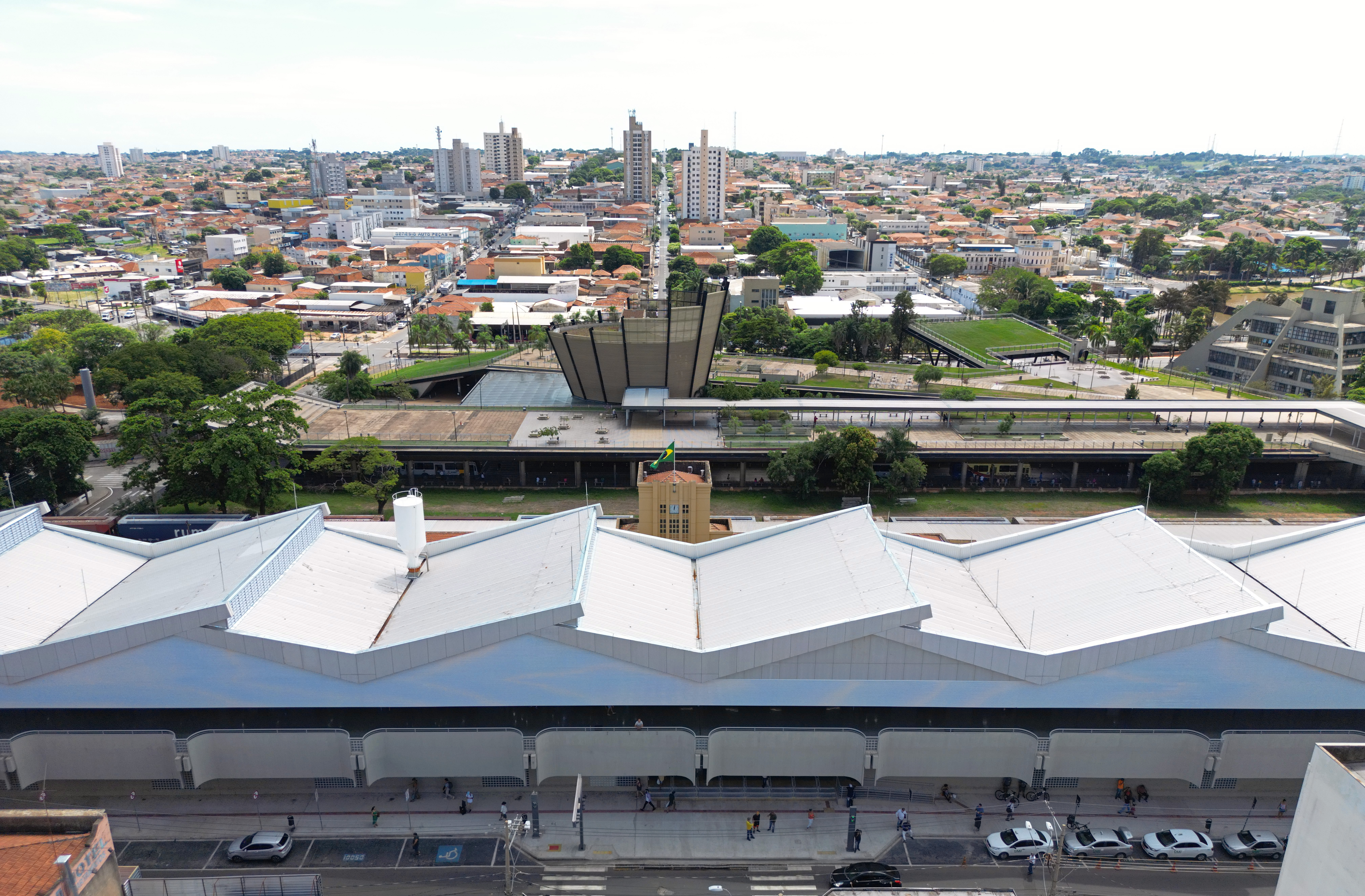
Governador Laudo Natel Bus Terminal and Professor Manoel Antunes Urban Terminal.

There are 2 companies operating the public transit system in the municipality with 230 buses on 80 different routes: Circular Santa Luzia, and Itamarati. The Professor Manoel Antunes Urban Terminal was inaugurated in 2019; the old urban terminal became an intermunicipal terminal that receives buses from the nearest cities, like José Bonifácio, Catanduva, Mirassol, Tanabi, Bady Bassitt, Cedral, Guapiaçu and others.

=== Roads ===
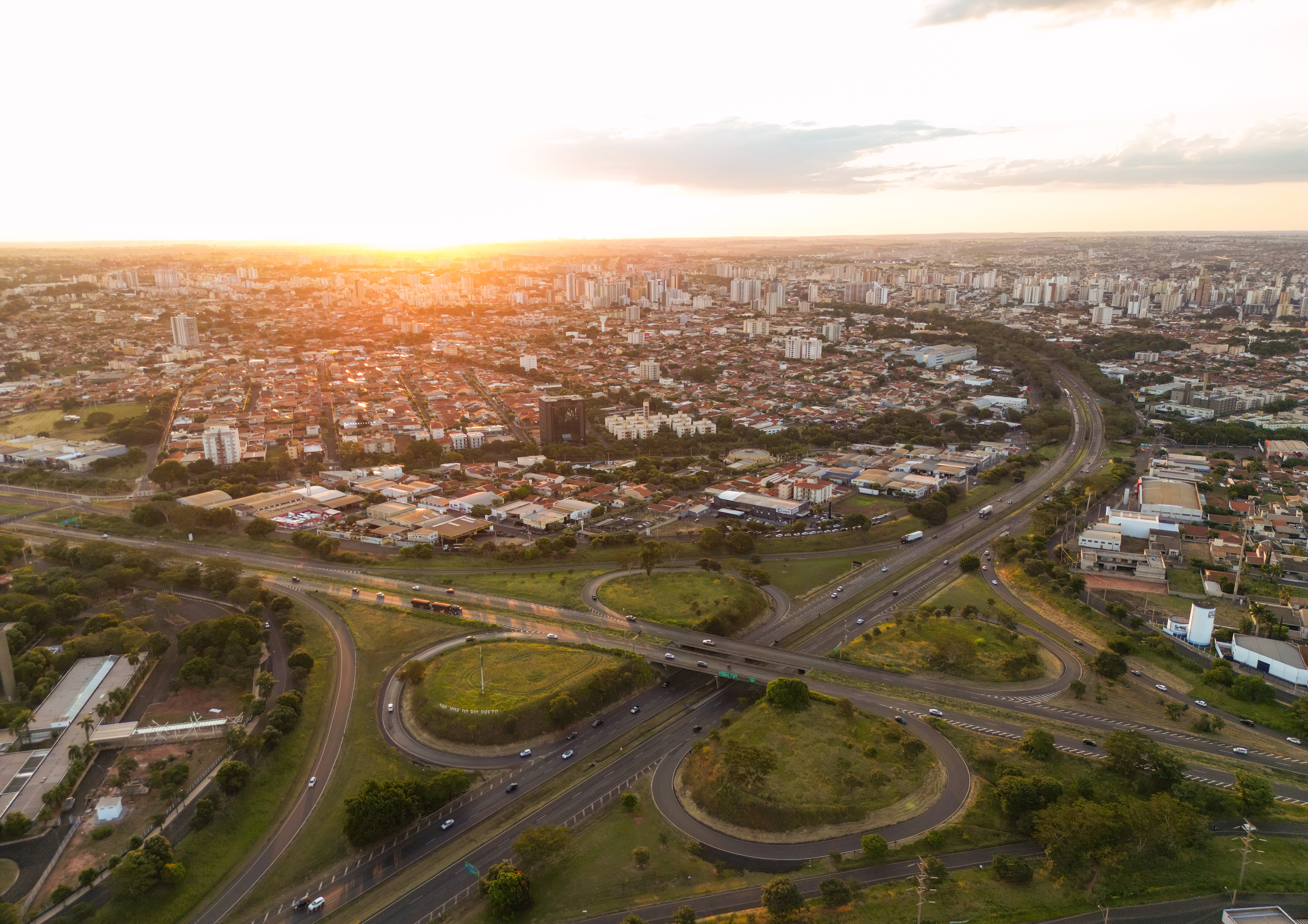
SP-310 and BR-153 highway junction in São José do Rio Preto.

- SP-310 – Rodovia Washington Luís (State highway) – São Paulo (445 km; 277 mi)
- BR-153 – Rodovia Transbrasiliana] (Federal highway) – Brasília (700 km; 430 mi)
- SP-425 – Rodovia Assis Chateaubriand (State highway) – Presidente Prudente (267 km; 166 mi)
- SP-427 – Rodovia Délcio Custódio da Silva (State highway) – Mirassolândia (25 km; 16 mi)

=== Air ===
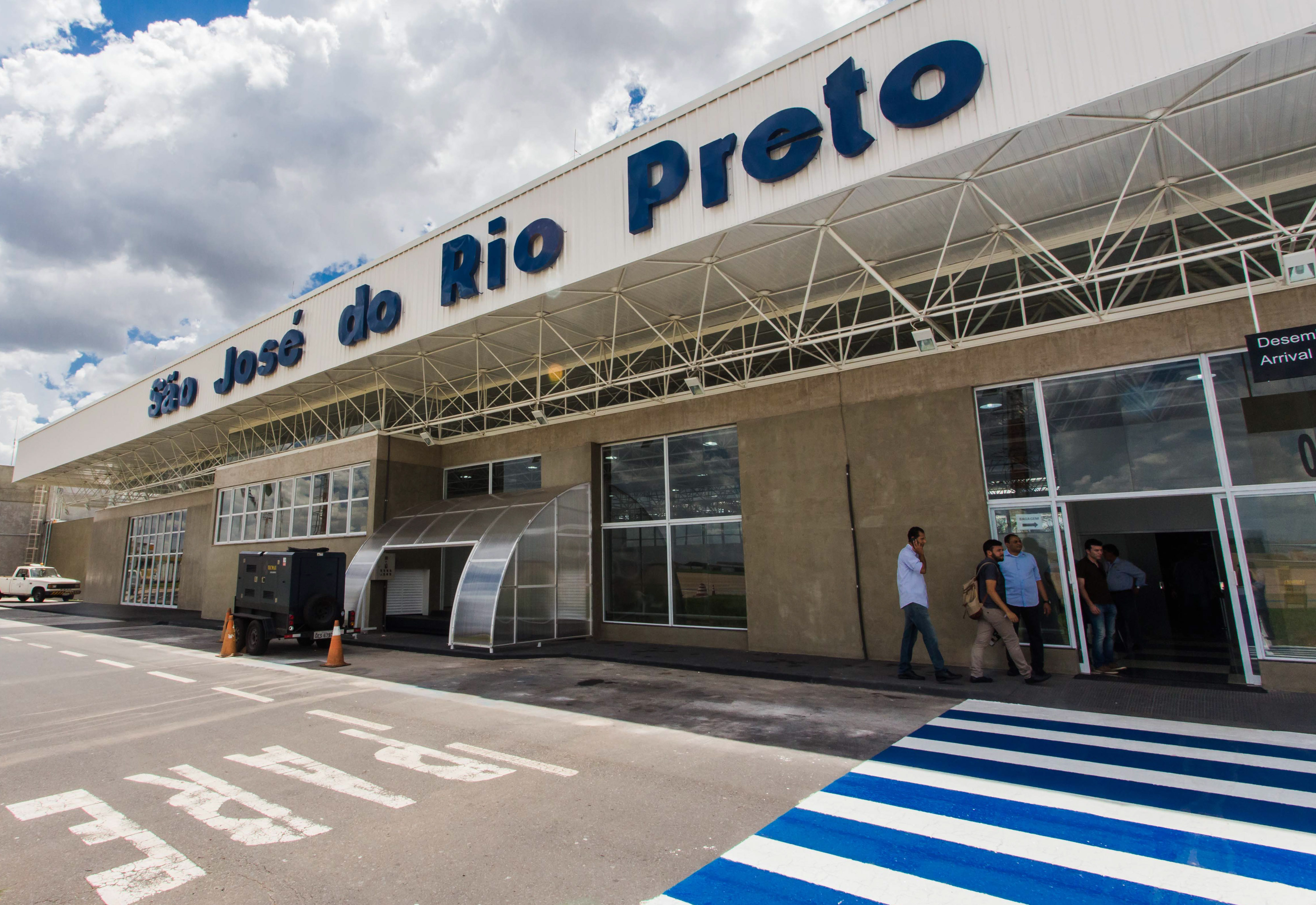
Prof. Eribelto Manoel Reino State Airport.

The São José do Rio Preto Airport, Professor Eribelto Manoel Reino, founded in 1959, provides commercial flights operated by three airlines: Azul, GOL and LATAM. Of the 27 regional airports in the state of São Paulo, São José do Rio Preto has the largest passenger traffic; in 2024, it registered the movement of more than 768 thousand passengers, a growth of 5.7% compared to 2023. The airport transported 649 tons of cargo in 2024; in 2023, it transported 518 tons of cargo. It connects the city to various destinations including São Paulo, Campinas, Guarulhos, Cuiabá and Porto Seguro. In 2022, it had a monthly average of over 55 thousand passengers on scheduled flights.

== Media ==
The major daily newspaper in São José do Rio Preto is the Diário da Região, founded in 1950.

São José do Rio Preto is the headquarters of Redevida, a Brazilian catholic television network. Redevida offers a diverse range of programming, catering to various interests and demographics. Its content includes Catholic-oriented shows such as TV masses, novenas, and rosaries, as well as news programs, variety shows, sports coverage, and more. The channel reaches audiences throughout Brazil via its affiliates and satellite services, covering a significant portion of the country.

In telecommunications, the city was served by Telecomunicações de São Paulo. In July 1998, this company was acquired by Telefónica, which adopted the Vivo brand in 2012. The company is currently an operator of cell phones, fixed lines, internet (fiber optics/4G) and television (satellite and cable).

== Culture ==
=== Music ===
The Symphony Orchestra of São José do Rio Preto (Orquestra Sinfônica de São José do Rio Preto) is a nonprofit organization founded in 1942 and holds the distinction of being the oldest orchestra in the city. It has also been recognized as part of the Cultural heritage.

=== Literature ===
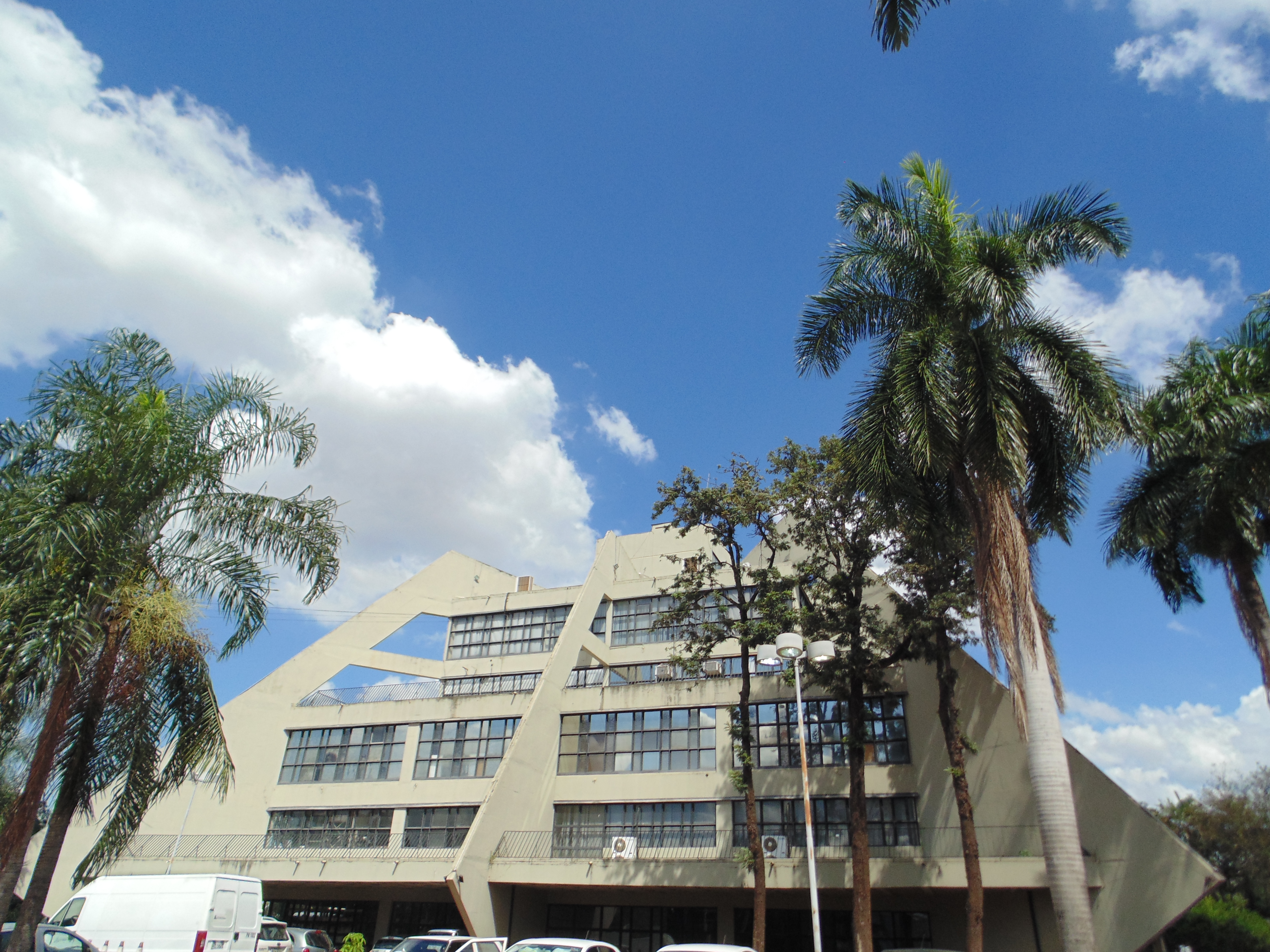
Dr. Fernando Costa Public Library.

The Dr. Fernando Costa Municipal Public Library currently houses approximately 46,000 volumes. It was officially inaugurated in 1943; the actual building was inaugurated on July 19, 1980, in the second term of mayor Adail Vetorazzo. The city also has three smaller public libraries and a bookmobile.

=== Theaters ===
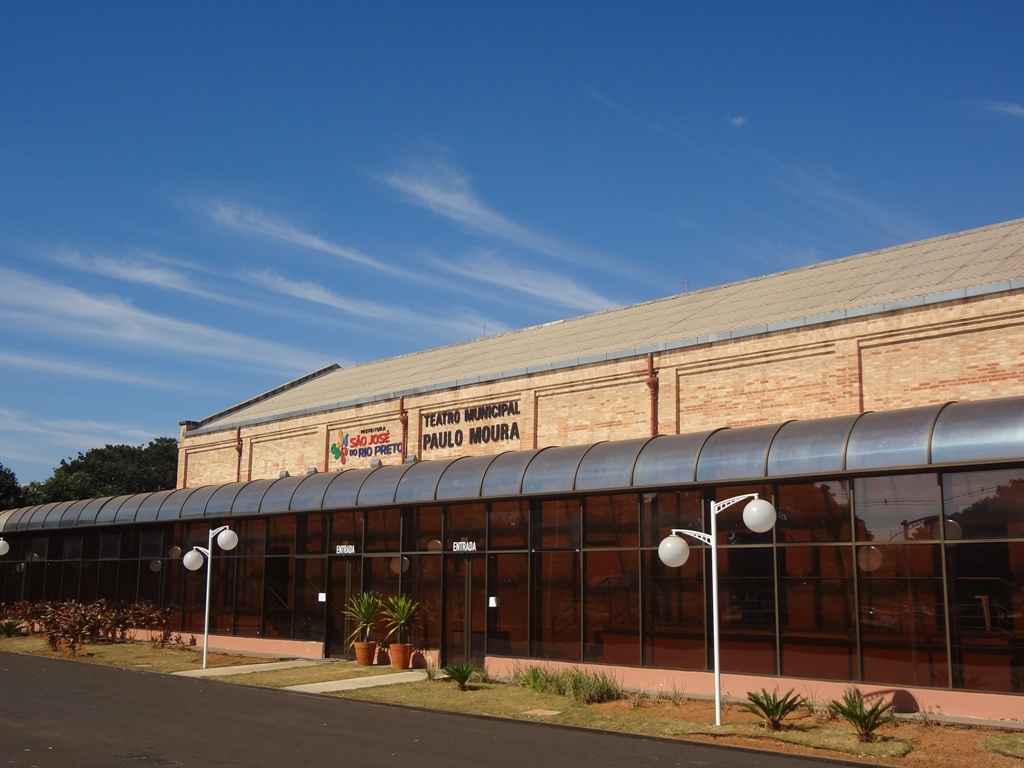
Paulo Moura Municipal Theater.

São José do Rio Preto has the Humberto Sinibaldi Neto Municipal Theater, the Paulo Moura Municipal Theater, the Nelson Castro Municipal Theater and the Waldemar de Oliveira Verdi SESI Theater. Additionally, the city hosts the International Theater Festival (FIT), that completed 56 years in 2025.

=== Museums ===
The city has the Railway Museum, inaugurated in 2024 in the old railway station, the José Antônio da Silva Museum of Primitivist Art (MAP), the Naïve Art Museum (MAN) and the Image and Sound Museum (MIS).

=== Events ===
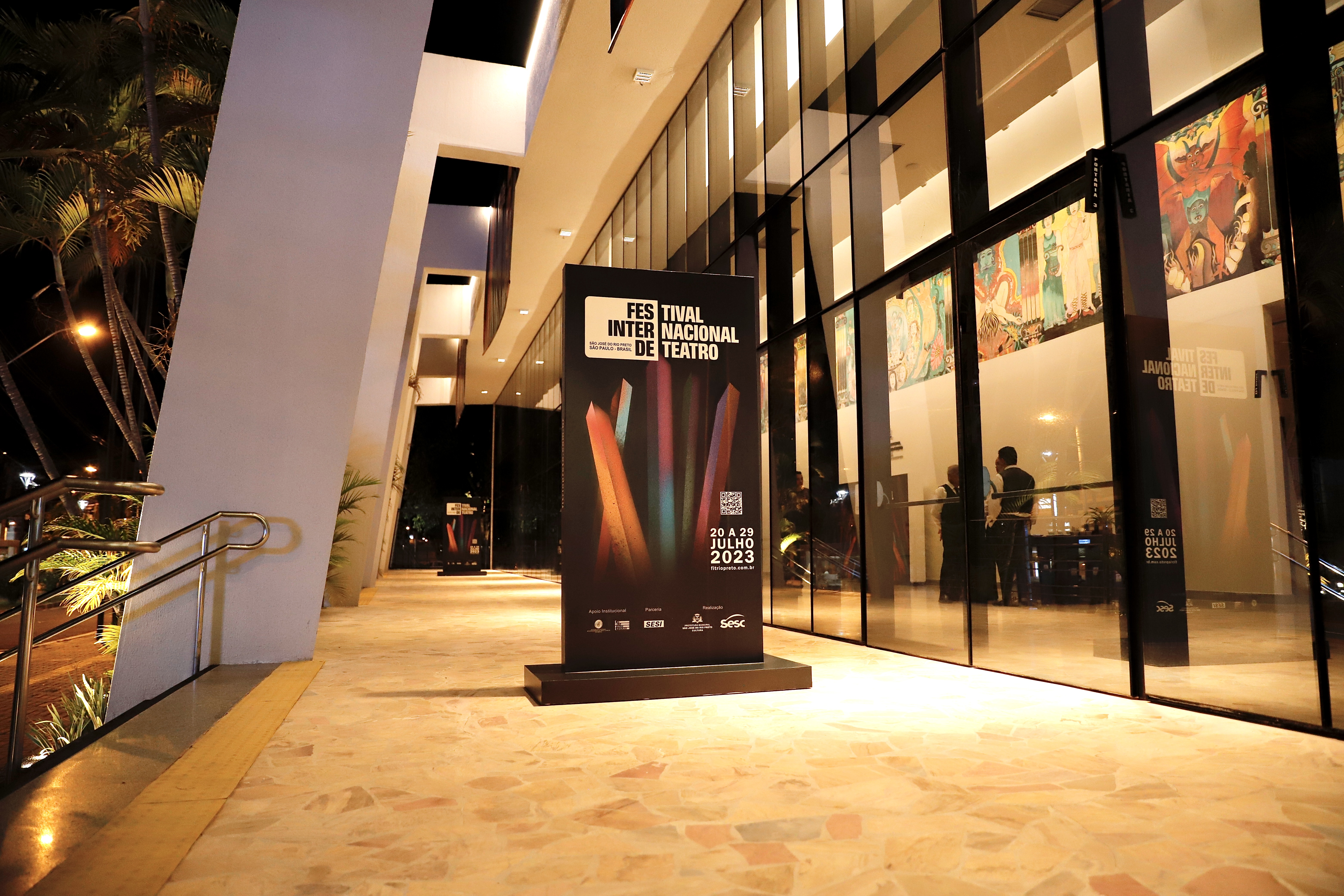
Launch of the International Theater Festival in 2023.

- Brazilian January of Comedy: it is a festival of theatrical shows focused on comedy. It lasts eight days, always in January, and the performances are held at the Humberto Sinibaldi Neto Municipal Theater. The first edition was held in 2003.
- Alberto Bertelli Lucatto Exhibition Grounds: where the EXPO Rio Preto takes place every year; it is dedicated to the agribusiness and is the largest agricultural fair in Northwest São Paulo. It is one of the main ones in Brazil's countryside and had its 62nd edition in 2025. In April 2026, hosted a Guns N' Roses show to 30 thousand people. In September 2026, hosted a Maroon 5 show.
- International Theater Festival (FIT): it is organized by the prefecture in partnership with SESC and happens in July. Created in 1969 as the National Amateur Theater Festival, in 2001 it expanded its borders and assumed an international dimension.
- Brazilian Popular Music Festival: the Vinícius Nucci Cucolicchio Brazilian Popular Music Festival happens in October in three days at the Humberto Sinibaldi Neto Municipal Theater.
- Rio Preto Country Bulls: it is a rodeo festival that happens every year in July. In 2025, it was attended by 100 thousand people in five days. It counts with shows from famous sertanejo artists.
- Carnival of São José do Rio Preto: it is a street event, open to the public and held annually during Carnival.

== Sports ==
The city is the home of two professional football clubs, namely América Futebol Clube and Rio Preto Esporte Clube. América Futebol Clube typically plays their matches at the Teixeirão Stadium, which has a seating capacity of over 32,000 people. Rio Preto Esporte Clube competes at the Anisio Haddad Stadium (Rio Pretão) with a capacity of 17,000.

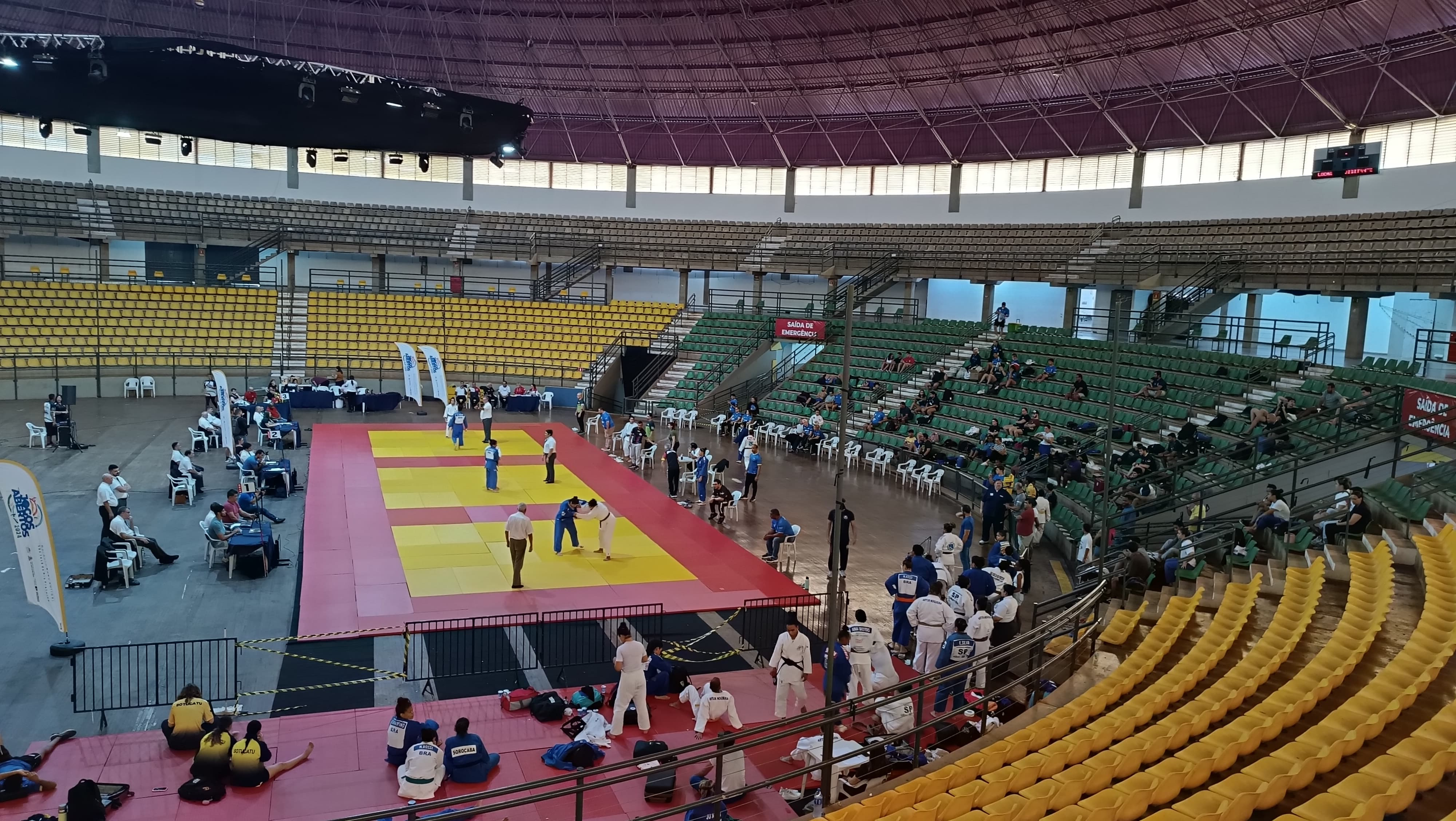
Centro Regional de Eventos.

The major public sports arena is the Centro Regional de Eventos (Regional Events Center), with a capacity of 5,600 attendants. The Centro Esportivo Integrado do Eldorado (Eldorado's Integrated Sports Center) has an official athletics track and other sports facilities.

São José do Rio Preto is also the home of Rio Preto Weilers, an american football team. Established in 2010 by a group of passionate enthusiasts, their aim was to promote the sport in the city and other regions of Brazil. The Weilers participate in the Liga BFA – Elite, and have already secured two national titles and one state title. Moreover, the team actively supports alternative sports groups for individuals with disabilities, including wheelchair basketball, and swimming. These groups consists of members from the philanthropic organization Clube Amigos dos Deficientes (Friends of the Disabled Club), who also competes at the national level.

== International relations ==
São José do Rio Preto has established twinning relationships with:

- Nantong, Jiangsu – China

== See also ==
- List of municipalities in São Paulo
