= Kid Vinil =

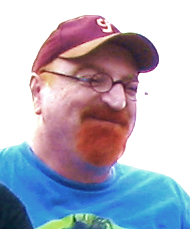

Background information
- Born: Antônio Carlos Senefonte; 10 March 1955; Cedral, Brazil
- Died: 19 May 2017 (aged 62) São Paulo, Brazil
- Genre: Rock
- Instrument: singer
- Website: www.kidvinil.com.br

Kid Vinil, stage name of Antônio Carlos Senefonte (Cedral, 10 March 1955 – São Paulo, 19 May 2017), was a Brazilian singer, radio broadcaster, composer and journalist. He became famous in the Brazilian rock of the 1980s.

== Biography ==
Kid Vinil was the vocalist of the Brazilian band Magazine, that used to execute the songs Tic Tic Nervoso (composed by Marcos Serra and Antonio Luiz), A Gata Comeu, Sou Boy and Glub Glub No Clube, all three composed by Kid himself. In the beginning of the 1980s, he had been member of Verminose, a band of the genres punk rock and rockabilly. He were too member of the São Paulo Punk Rock Movement in its beginning, organizing shows and playing songs of bands of punk rock and post-punk in his radio program.

In TV, he has taken place as artist of the television program Boca Livre in 1987 in TV Cultura. In Bandeirantes TV, he has presented the program Mocidade Independente and after he became VJ (video performance artist) of MTV, taking place in programs like Lado B in which he used to present videoclips.

He returned to the scene in Magazine in 2000, with the second work by the label Trama, the CD Na Honestidade in 2002. Closed the Magazine, he made a new band, the Kid Vinil Xperience in 2005 and recorded his first independent CD in 2010, named Time Was.

In 2008, he wrote a book by publisher Ediouro called Almanaque do Rock, that reports the history of the rock, beginning in the 1950s until nowadays. He then travelled around Brazil, produced revival 1980s parties and showed with the Kid Vinil Xperience.

He died on 19 May 2017, aged 62.

== See also ==
- Música popular brasileira

== Bibliography ==
- Senefonte, Antônio Carlos. Almanaque do Rock. Rio de Janeiro:Ediouro, 2008. ISBN 978-85-00-02145-9
