= Guapiaçu =

- Municipality
- Município de Guapiaçu; Municipality of Guapiaçu
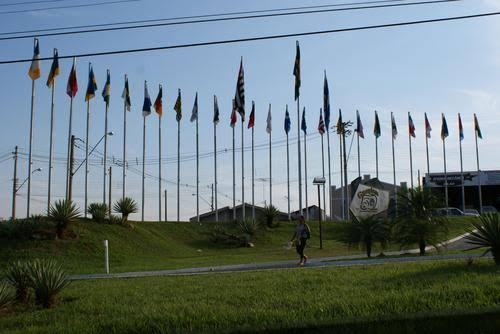

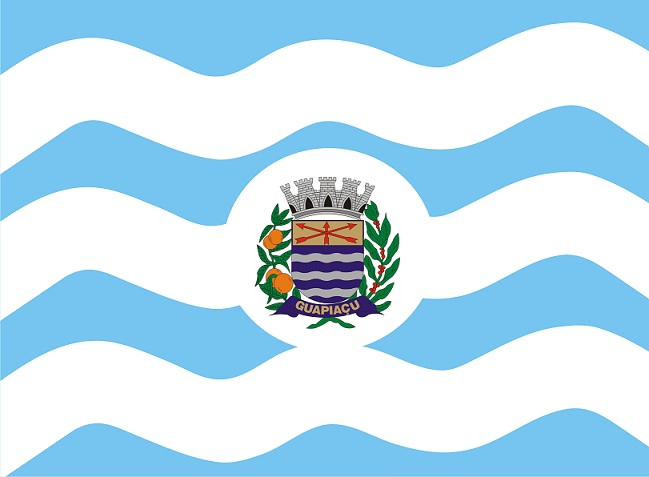
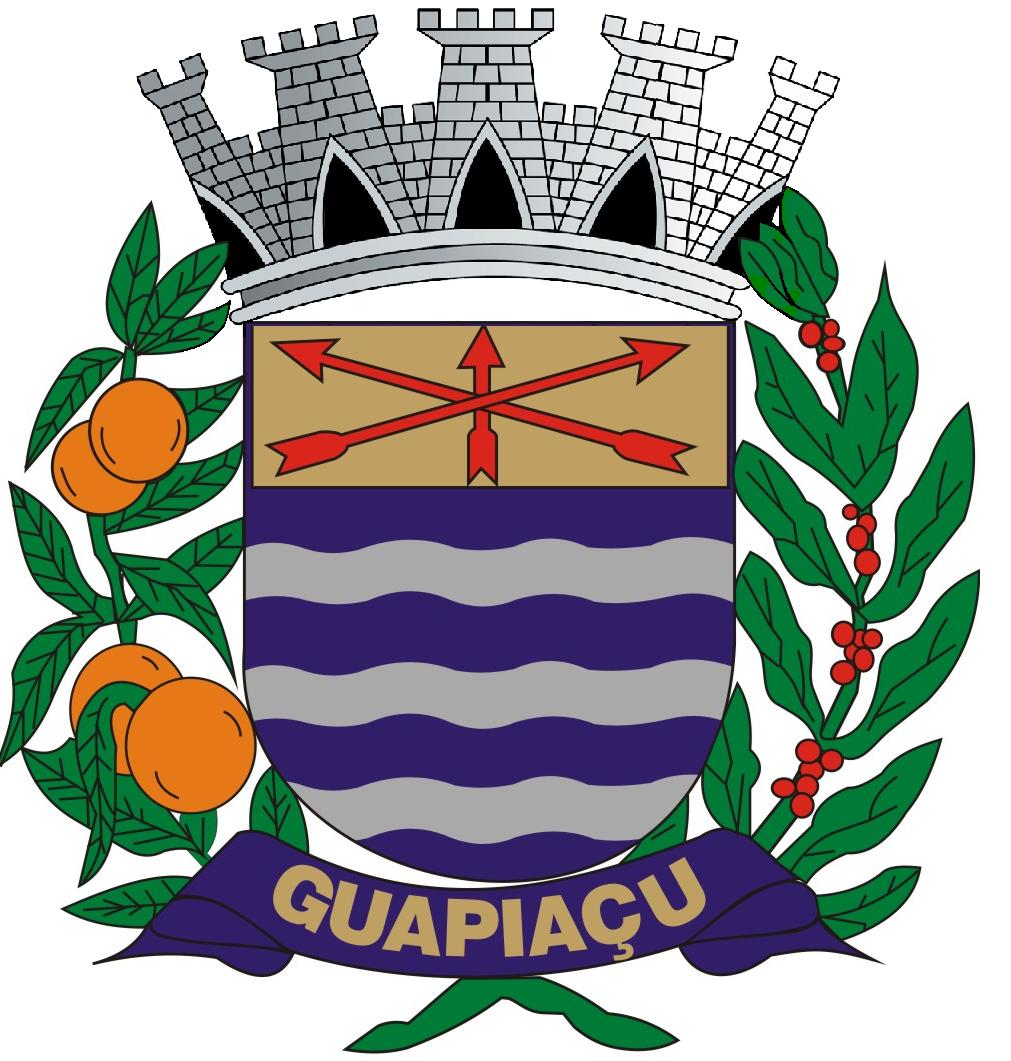
- Flag Coat of arms

- Location of Guapiaçu
- Coordinates: 20°47′42″S 49°13′13″W
- Country: Brazil
- Region: Southeast
- State: São Paulo
- Mesoregion: São José do Rio Preto
- Founded: November 30, 1953

Government
  - Mayor: Carlos César Zaitune (PMDB)
  - Vice Mayor: Mauro Ruiz

Area
  - Total: 326 km^{2} (126 sq mi)
- Elevation: 480 m (1,570 ft)

Population (2020)
  - Total: 21,775
  - Density: 54.8/km^{2} (142/sq mi)
- Demonym: Portuguese: Guapiaçuense
- Time zone: UTC−3 (BRT)
- Postal Code: 15110-000
- Area code: (+55) 17
- Website: Guapiaçu's Prefecture

Guapiaçu is a municipality in the state of São Paulo, Brazil, with a population, measured in 2020 by the IBGE, of 21,775 and an area of 326 km^{2} (126 sq mi). Is located in the north/northwest of the state, 17 kilometres (11 mi) from São José do Rio Preto.

The city name comes from the Tupi language, and means "Big spring (of a river)".

== History ==
The settlement of the region began at the end of the 19th century. At the beginning of the 20th century, the city was a village named Ribeirão Claro. On 28 November 1927 the village was elevated to a district. The name changed to its current form in 1945. The city was established as a municipality on 30 November 1953, when it was separated from Rio Preto.

== Demographics ==
=== Indicators ===
- Population: 17,869 (IBGE/2010)
- Area: 326 km^{2} (126 sq mi)
- Population density: 54.8/km² (2,451.5/sq mi)
- Urbanization: 88.4% (2010)
- Birth rate: 11.59/1,000 inhabitants (2009)
- Infant mortality: 9.9/1,000 births (2009)
- Literacy rate: 90.26 (2000)
- HDI: 0.817 (UNDP/2000)

All indicators are from SEADE and IBGE.

== Economy ==
Manufacturing is the economic basis of Guapiaçu, producing 53.2% of the city's GDP. The tertiary sector provides 39.4% of GDP, and the primary sector 7.3%.

== Transportation ==
- SP-425 "Rodovia Assis Chateaubriand", 17 kilometres (11 mi) to São José do Rio Preto
- Estrada Vicinal (Vicinal road) to Cedral

== Media ==
In telecommunications, the city was served by Telecomunicações de São Paulo. In July 1998, this company was acquired by Telefónica, which adopted the Vivo brand in 2012. The company is currently an operator of cell phones, fixed lines, internet (fiber optics/4G) and television (satellite and cable).

== See also ==
- List of municipalities in São Paulo
- Interior of São Paulo
