= Cedral =

Municipality in the state of São Paulo in Brazil

- Municipality
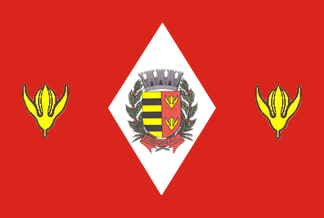
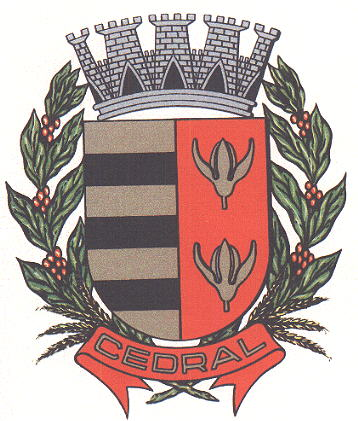
- Flag Coat of arms

- Location in São Paulo state

- Location in Brazil
- Coordinates: 20°54′16″S 49°16′07″W
- Country: Brazil
- Region: Southeast
- State: São Paulo
- Mesoregion: São José do Rio Preto
- Microregion: São José do Rio Preto

Government
  - Mayor: José Luis Pedrão

Area
  - Total: 197.9 km^{2} (76.4 sq mi)
- Elevation: 558 m (1,831 ft)

Population (2020)
  - Total: 9,346
  - Density: 47.23/km^{2} (122.3/sq mi)
- Time zone: UTC−3 (BRT)
- Postal code: 15895-000
- Area code: +55 17
- Website: www.cedral.sp.gov.br

Cedral is a municipality in the state of São Paulo, Brazil. The population is 9,346 (2020 est.) in an area of 197.9 km^{2} (76.4 sq mi). The municipality belongs to the mesoregion and microregion of São José do Rio Preto.

== Demographics ==
Historical population
Year	Pop.	±%
2001	6,700	—
2010	7,972	+19.0%
2015	8,767	+10.0%

The life expectancy for the city is 75.15 years.

== Media ==
In telecommunications, the city was served by Telecomunicações de São Paulo. In July 1998, this company was acquired by Telefónica, which adopted the Vivo brand in 2012. The company is currently an operator of cell phones, fixed lines, internet (fiber optics/4G) and television (satellite and cable).

== See also ==
- List of municipalities in São Paulo
- Interior of São Paulo
