= Microregion of São José do Rio Preto =

- Microregion
- Location of the Microregion of São José do Rio Preto
- Coordinates: 20°48′29″S 49°22′52″W
- Country: Brazil
- Region: Southeast
- State: São Paulo
- Mesoregion: São José do Rio Preto

Area
  - Total: 10,397.8 km^{2} (4,014.6 sq mi)

Population (2010/IBGE)
  - Total: 763,534
  - Density: 73.4323/km^{2} (190.189/sq mi)
- Time zone: UTC-3 (UTC-3)
  - Summer (DST): UTC-2 (UTC-2)
- Postal Code: 15000-000
- Area code: +55 17

The Microregion of São José do Rio Preto (Portuguese: Microrregião de São José do Rio Preto) is located in the northern part of the state of São Paulo, Brazil, and comprises 29 municipalities. It is a part of the Mesoregion of São José do Rio Preto.

The microregion has a population of 763,534 inhabitants and covers an area of 10,397.8 square kilometers.

== Municipalities ==
The microregion is composed of the following municipalities, which are listed below along with their respective populations according to the 2010 Census (IBGE/2010):

- Adolfo: 3,557
- Altair: 3,815
- Bady Bassitt: 14,603
- Bálsamo: 8,160
- Cedral: 7,972
- Guapiaçu: 17,869
- Guaraci: 9,976
- Ibirá: 10,896
- Icém: 7,462
- Ipiguá: 4,463
- Jaci: 5,657
- José Bonifácio: 32,763
- Mendonça: 4,640
- Mirassol: 53,792
- Mirassolândia: 4,295
- Nova Aliança: 5,891
- Nova Granada: 19,180
- Olímpia: 50,024
- Onda Verde: 3,884
- Orindiúva: 5,675
- Palestina: 11,051
- Paulo de Faria: 8,589
- Planalto: 4,463
- Potirendaba: 15,449
- São José do Rio Preto: 408,258
- Tanabi: 24,055
- Ubarana: 5,289
- Uchoa: 9,471
- Zacarias: 2,335

== See also ==
- Interior of São Paulo
