= Mirassol =

- Municipality
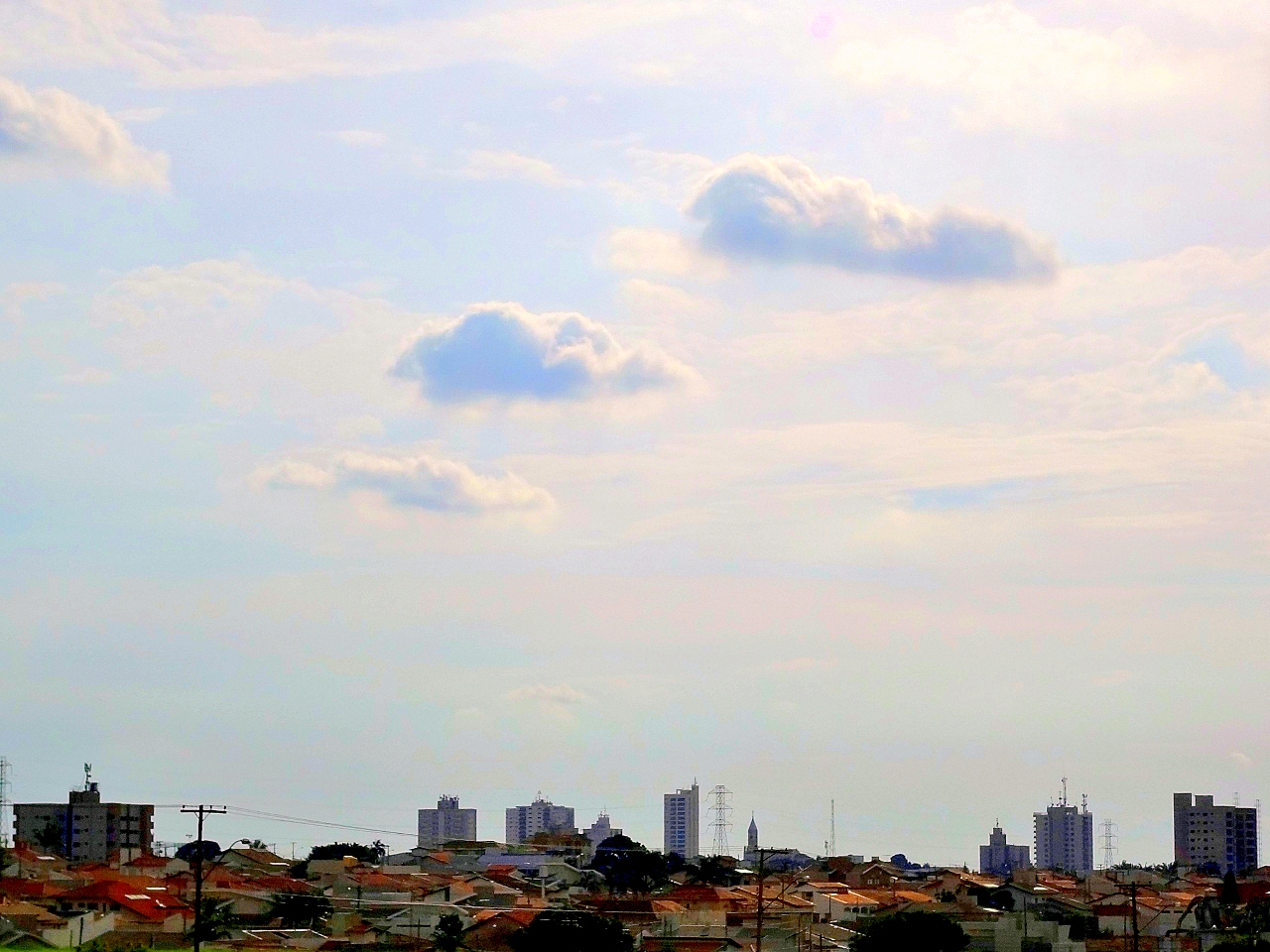
- View of Mirassol

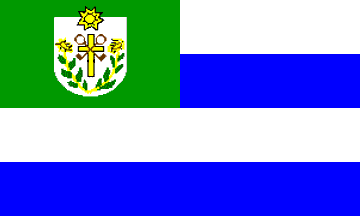
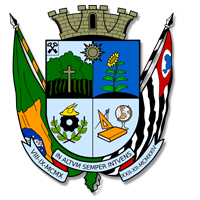
- Flag Coat of arms

- Location of Mirassol
- Coordinates: 20°49′08″S 49°31′15″W
- Country: Brazil
- Region: Southeast
- State: São Paulo
- Established: 2009

Government
  - Mayor: Edson Antonio Ermenegildo

Area
  - Total: 243.161 km^{2} (93.885 sq mi)
- Elevation: 587 m (1,926 ft)

Population (2020)
  - Total: 60,303
  - Density: 248.00/km^{2} (642.31/sq mi)
- Time zone: UTC−3 (BRT)
- Postal Code: 15130-000
- Area code: +55 17
- Website: Prefecture of Mirassol, São Paulo

Mirassol is a municipality in the state of São Paulo, Brazil. The city is located in the northern part of the state, 453 km from the city of São Paulo and 15 km from São José do Rio Preto. Mirassol has 60,303 inhabitants (IBGE/2020).

The city belongs to the Microregion of São José do Rio Preto.

== Geography ==
=== Neighbouring places ===
Mirassolândia, Ipiguá, São José do Rio Preto, Bady Bassitt, Nova Aliança, Jaci, Neves Paulista and Bálsamo

== History ==
The city was founded on September 8, 1910, by Joaquim da Costa Penha, with the name of São Pedro da Mata Una. On November 27, 1919, the village changed its name to Mirassol, being elevated to district.

The city was officially established as a municipality on December 23, 1924.

== Economy ==
Mirassol has a relevant furniture industry, and 30% of the city's GDP comes from the Secondary sector. Commerce and services corresponds to 68% of the economy.

== Demographics ==
Year	Population
2010	53,792
2011	54,343

The HDI, measured by the UNDP, was 0.822 in the year 2000. The life expectancy for the city is 75.42 years. The literacy rate, measured in 2000 by SEADE, was 92.35%.

There weren't homicides in the year 2008. In 2007, Mirassol had 1 homicide.

=== Statistics ===
- Area: 243.80 km^{2}
- Urban area: 47.07 km^{2}
- Population density: 221.22/km^{2} (IBGE/2010) - 222.90/km^{2} (SEADE/2011)
- Urbanization: 93.9% (2010)
- Sex ratio (Males to Females): 96.35 (2011)
- Birth rate: 12.43/1,000 inhabitants (2009)
- Infant mortality: 7.56/1,000 births (2009)
- Homicide rate: 0.0/100 thousand ppl (2008)
- HDI: 0.822 (UNDP/2000)

All statistics are from SEADE and IBGE.

== Media ==
In telecommunications, the city was served by Telecomunicações de São Paulo. In July 1998, this company was acquired by Telefónica, which adopted the Vivo brand in 2012. The company is currently an operator of cell phones, fixed lines, internet (fiber optics/4G) and television (satellite and cable).

== Transportation ==
The city is linked with the SP-310 (Rodovia Washington Luis) and SP-320 (Rodovia Euclides da Cunha) state highways. Mirassol has an airport for small planes.

== Sports ==
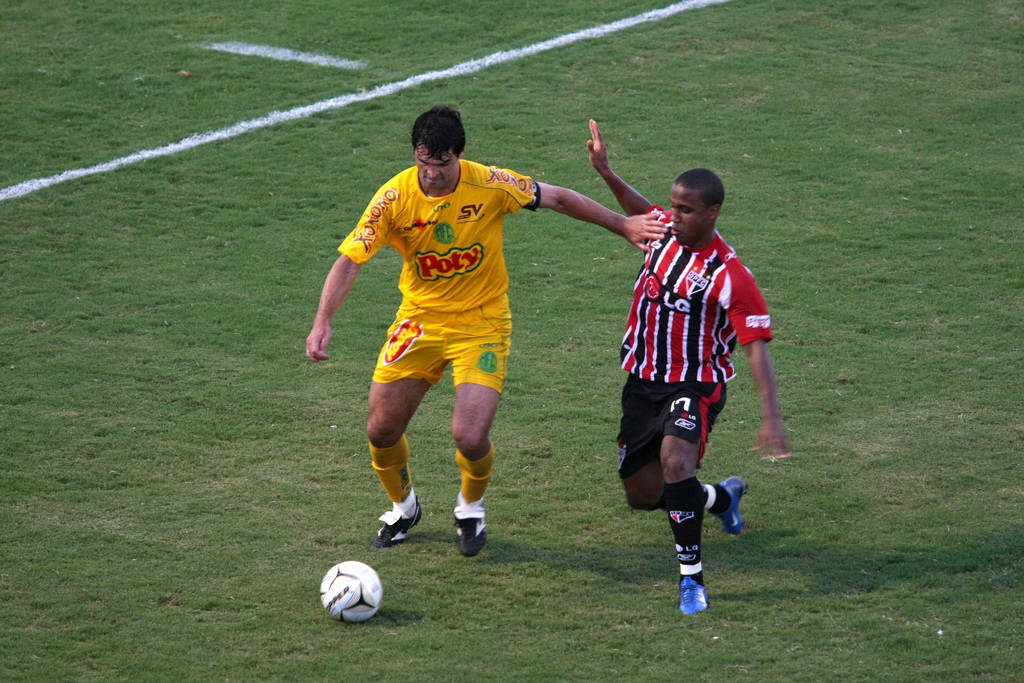
Mirassol FC (in yellow), playing against São Paulo FC

Mirassol Futebol Clube, founded in 1925, is the city's football (soccer) club. The team's stadium is the Estádio Municipal José Maria de Campos Maia, which has a maximum capacity of 14,534 people.

== Notable people ==
- André Zuba, footballer
- Doriva, former footballer

== See also ==
- List of municipalities in São Paulo
- Interior of São Paulo
