= Zuba =

Zuba may refer to:

- Zuba (name)
- Zuba, a fictional lion in Madagascar: Escape 2 Africa
- Zuba (TV series), a Zambian television drama series
- Zuba, Nigeria, a local government area in Nigeria
  - Koro Zuba language of Nigeria
- ZubaBox, solar-powered internet café developed by Computer Aid International

== See also ==
- Zubaz
