= Bady Bassitt =

- Municipality
- Flag Coat of arms

- Location in São Paulo state

- Location in Brazil
- Coordinates: 20°55′5″S 49°26′43″W
- Country: Brazil
- Region: Southeast
- State: São Paulo
- Metropolitan region: São José do Rio Preto
- Intermediate geographic region: São José do Rio Preto
- Immediate geographic region: São José do Rio Preto
- Municipality established: February 18, 1959

Government
  - Mayor: Janimeiri Catelani Buzzi

Area
  - Total: 110.372 km^{2} (42.615 sq mi)
- Elevation: 510 m (1,670 ft)

Population (2022)
  - Total: 27,260
  - Density: 246.98/km^{2} (639.7/sq mi)
- Demonym: Badiense
- Time zone: UTC−3 (BRT)
- Postal code: 15115-000
- Area code: +55 17
- HDI: 0.746
- Website: www.badybassitt.sp.gov.br

Bady Bassitt is a municipality in the state of São Paulo, Brazil. It is located in the northwestern part of the state, about 7 km from São José do Rio Preto. The municipality had a population of 27,260 at the 2022 census, while the Brazilian Institute of Geography and Statistics estimated its population at 29,346 in 2025. It has an area of 110.372 km² and is part of the São José do Rio Preto metropolitan region.

== History ==
The area now occupied by Bady Bassitt was settled in the late 19th century. According to the municipal government's historical account, the parents of Lourenço da Silva Pontes owned land in the Borá and Campo farms. At the time, the area was covered by virgin forest and lacked roads. A stream between the two properties was called Borboleta because of the large number of butterflies found along an old road near its banks. The name Borboleta was subsequently applied to the settlement that developed there.

In 1908, a road connecting the settlement with São José do Rio Preto was opened. Camilo de Morais established the first general store in Borboleta in 1912, becoming the first merchant to establish himself in the settlement.

Manoel Antonio da Silva donated one alqueire of land for the establishment of the settlement's patrimony. A chapel dedicated to Saint Sebastian was built there in 1914, and the settlement was formally founded on February 13 of that year.

Borboleta became a district of the municipality and comarca of Rio Preto in 1926. State Law No. 2,171-A of December 28, 1926, created the district of peace of Borboleta.

The municipality of Borboleta was created by State Law No. 5,285 of February 18, 1959. João Matheus Teles de Menezes became its first mayor.

The municipality was subsequently renamed Bady Bassitt. The São Paulo Legislative Assembly records the change under State Law No. 8,092 of February 28, 1964, which refers to the municipality as Bady Bassitt, formerly Borboleta. The municipal government's history attributes the change to a law passed in the early 1960s and states that the new name was chosen in honor of Bady Bassitt, a state politician from the São José do Rio Preto area.

In 1974, a municipal law officially recognized Antonio Manuel da Silva as the founder of the municipality.

== Geography ==
Bady Bassitt is located at 20°55′05″S 49°26′43″W, at an elevation of approximately 510 metres above sea level. The municipality covers 110.372 km². It borders Mirassol to the northwest, São José do Rio Preto to the northeast, Nova Aliança to the southwest, Potirendaba to the south, and Cedral to the southeast.

The municipality forms part of the São José do Rio Preto metropolitan region, established by São Paulo State Complementary Law No. 1,359 of August 24, 2021. The metropolitan region comprises 37 municipalities.

Under the IBGE's 2017 geographical division, Bady Bassitt is in the intermediate geographic region and immediate geographic region of São José do Rio Preto. This system replaced the former microregion and mesoregion system used in older statistical publications.

=== Hydrography ===
Several streams cross the municipality. The principal waterways identified by the municipal government are the Córrego Borboleta, Córrego Borá and Córrego dos Macacos.

The Córrego Borboleta has also been identified in regional scientific research examining the effects of urbanization on stream ecosystems in the São José do Rio Preto metropolitan area.

Bady Bassitt lies within the Tietê-Batalha river basin, one of the water-resource management units used by the state of São Paulo.

=== Climate and vegetation ===
Bady Bassitt is located in northwestern São Paulo, a region described in a 2025 study of streams in the São José do Rio Preto metropolitan area as having a tropical climate with a dry season and a wetter season. The study characterizes the regional vegetation as semideciduous seasonal forest in transition with Cerrado, while noting the effects of urbanization and historical land-use change on stream environments.

The municipality's landscape has been substantially transformed by urbanization and agricultural use. A plan produced for the Tietê-Batalha basin identified areas within Bady Bassitt for priority forest restoration and water-resource conservation.

== Demographics ==
According to the 2022 census, Bady Bassitt had 27,260 inhabitants, of whom 26,080 lived in urban areas and 1,180 in rural areas. There were 13,369 males and 13,891 females. The population density was 246.98 inhabitants per km².

The municipality experienced particularly rapid population growth during the late 20th and early 21st centuries. The 1991 census recorded 5,716 inhabitants, increasing to 11,538 in 2000 and 14,603 in 2010 before reaching 27,260 in 2022.

The population recorded in 2022 was 86.87% larger than that recorded in 2010. The municipal government, citing the census results, reported an annual geometric growth rate of 5.34% during the period and described the municipality as the fastest-growing municipality in São Paulo by percentage growth at that time.

The 2022 census also recorded an average of 2.74 residents per household in the municipality.

=== Population history ===
| Census | Population |
|---|---|
| 1991 | 5,716 |
| 2000 | 11,538 |
| 2010 | 14,603 |
| 2022 | 27,260 |
| 2025 estimate | 29,346 |

Sources: IBGE census publications and the 2025 population estimate.

=== Human development ===
Bady Bassitt had a Municipal Human Development Index (IDHM) of 0.746 in 2010. The municipal government reports component values of 0.950 for income, 0.709 for longevity and 0.669 for education.

== Government ==
Bady Bassitt is governed at the municipal level by a mayor and a Municipal Chamber. Janimeiri Catelani Buzzi took office as mayor in January 2025 for the 2025–2028 term, alongside Vice Mayor Elias Barufi. Eleven councilors were sworn in for the same legislative term.

The municipality's current administration has also introduced or amended local regulations covering education, sanitation, public services and use of municipal facilities. In 2026, for example, the municipal government adopted regulations for public water and wastewater services and established rules governing the temporary use of the municipal exhibition grounds for cultural, sporting, recreational, religious and other events.

== Economy ==
Bady Bassitt's economy is dominated by services and commerce, with industry also contributing to municipal economic activity. In the regional planning data for 2019, services provided the largest share of value added, accounting for 63.6% from private services and a further 21.1% from public administration, defense, education and health. Industry accounted for 10.7%, while agriculture accounted for 4.7%.

The IBGE reported a municipal GDP per capita of R$27,960.20 for 2023.

Bady Bassitt's location beside major highways and its proximity to São José do Rio Preto have contributed to its integration with the metropolitan economy. The municipality contains industrial and commercial areas along the BR-153 corridor, while residential development has expanded substantially in the surrounding urban area.

Older municipal economic profiles attributed a larger combined share of the local GDP to commerce, services and administration and identified industry as the second-largest sector. Those figures are retained in historical sources but are not directly comparable with the more recent value-added methodology used in regional planning documents.

== Education ==
Education in Bady Bassitt is provided through municipal, state and private institutions. The municipal government operates primary education facilities and complementary educational services throughout the municipality.

The municipal education department reported five schools serving the first years of elementary education and municipal facilities serving the final years of elementary education. Schools named in the municipal education system include E.M. Isabel Pimentel, E.M. João Ramos Neto, E.M. Maria Darnel Carvalho de Castro, E.M. Maria Inez Brandolezi Chessa, E.M. Nice Beolchi Nunes Ferreira and E.M. João Matheus Telles de Menezes.

In 2022, the schooling rate for children aged 6 to 14 was 99.38%.

The 2023 Basic Education Development Index (IDEB) was 6.7 for the municipal network in the early years of elementary education. For the final years, the index was 4.9 for municipal schools, 5.5 for the state network and 5.2 for public schools overall.

The municipality continued to develop its education administration during 2026. In August of that year, the municipal government established a permanent Municipal Education Forum and adopted technical criteria for selecting school-management personnel in accordance with federal funding requirements.

== Health and sanitation ==
The IBGE recorded an infant mortality rate of 5.48 deaths per 1,000 live births in 2023.

Bady Bassitt's public health system has historically relied on municipal services and facilities, while more specialized medical care is also connected to the regional health network centered on São José do Rio Preto. The municipality began planning a new municipal hospital in the 2020s. In July 2026, the Municipal Chamber approved authorization for the administration to obtain financing for construction of the proposed Hospital Municipal de Bady Bassitt. The project was designed to include 24-hour urgent and emergency care, examinations, small surgical procedures and inpatient beds.

The municipality has a public water and wastewater system administered at municipal level. A 2024 report presented to the Municipal Chamber stated that the sewerage system had 161.3 km of collection network, six sewage lift stations and one wastewater treatment plant. The same report stated that the municipal treatment plant treated all sewage entering the treatment system at that time.

Census 2022 data show that 95.5% of the population used a general network, stormwater network or septic system connected to the network for sewage disposal. A further 1.5% used an unconnected septic or filter system, while 3.0% used rudimentary pits. No resident was recorded as living without a bathroom or sanitary facility.

== Culture and recreation ==
=== Religion ===
The municipality's principal Catholic parish is the Parish of São Sebastião, which is part of the Roman Catholic Archdiocese of São José do Rio Preto. The parish serves the municipal seat and a number of chapels in surrounding neighborhoods and rural areas, including chapels dedicated to Our Lady of Aparecida, Our Lady of Perpetual Help, Our Lady of Fátima, the Sacred Hearts of Jesus and Mary, and Santos Reis.

The annual Festa de São Sebastião is one of the municipality's longstanding religious and community events. The 77th edition was held in January 2026 and included novenas, quermesses, food stalls, bingo and auctions organized by the parish community.

=== Sports ===
Municipal sports programs have included football, futsal, volleyball, swimming and capoeira, as well as recreational and fitness activities.

The municipality's Olimpíadas de Férias, a community sports competition held during school holidays, returned in 2025 after an extended interruption. Its second edition was held in July 2026 and featured 23 sports, including athletics, basketball, swimming, football, futsal, handball, volleyball, martial arts, chess and table tennis. The opening ceremony was attended by more than 2,000 people, according to the municipal government.

=== Tourism ===
The municipality established its Municipal Tourism Council, or COMTUR, under Municipal Law No. 1,752 of December 12, 2005. The council's members were formally appointed in 2017.

Bady Bassitt was incorporated into a regional tourism plan associated with the Rota Caipira. Municipal tourism planning identified traditional pork-related commerce as one of the activities used to represent the municipality, while also identifying restaurants and leisure facilities as attractions. The municipality's tourism initiatives have included improvements to recreational areas, the revitalization of a reservoir in the Residencial Menezes neighborhood and the creation of the Parque Ecológico Nara Rúbia Ojeda Prioto.

The Parque Ecológico Nara Rúbia Ojeda continues to be used for municipal recreation and community programs. In 2026 it hosted activities organized for children participating in a municipal social-assistance program.

== Transportation ==
Bady Bassitt is crossed by BR-153 (Transbrasiliana), which provides the principal road connection with São José do Rio Preto and the wider regional road network. Other highways serving the municipality include SP-310 and SP-355 (Rodovia Maurício Goulart).

The municipal government describes the municipality as having road transport links but no railway or airport facilities. Road transport therefore provides the principal connection between Bady Bassitt and the regional center of São José do Rio Preto.

The municipality has also undertaken road and access works associated with the BR-153 corridor. In 2026, a municipal decree declared areas of land necessary for the extension of the municipal access road to the BR-153 and related improvements to the local road system.

== Telecommunications ==
Telecommunications in the municipality were historically provided through Telecomunicações de São Paulo (Telesp), the state telephone company created in 1973. Telesp was later acquired by Telefónica in 1998, and the group subsequently adopted the Vivo brand for its Brazilian telecommunications operations.

== Municipal infrastructure and development ==
Bady Bassitt has experienced substantial residential expansion during the 21st century. Census results showing the large increase in population between 2010 and 2022 have been accompanied by continued expansion of municipal infrastructure, education, sanitation, transportation and public recreational facilities.

The municipality's public administration has continued to authorize infrastructure projects to accommodate this growth. Recent measures include the expansion of access infrastructure around the BR-153, continuing regulation of the municipal water and wastewater system, and investment planning for a new municipal hospital.

== See also ==
- List of municipalities in São Paulo
- São José do Rio Preto
- Interior of São Paulo
- São José do Rio Preto metropolitan area
