= Guaraci (disambiguation) =

Guaraci or Quaraci may refer to

- Guaraci, god of the Guaraní mythology
- Guaraci, São Paulo, Brazilian municipality in the state of São Paulo
- Guaraci, Paraná, Brazilian municipality in the state of Paraná
- Guaraci Francisco de Oliveira Filho (born 1992), Brazilian footballer
