= Bálsamo =

Municipality in the state of São Paulo in Brazil

- Municipality
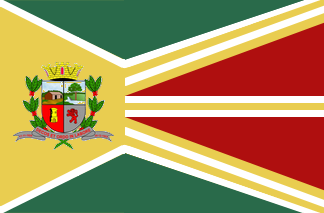
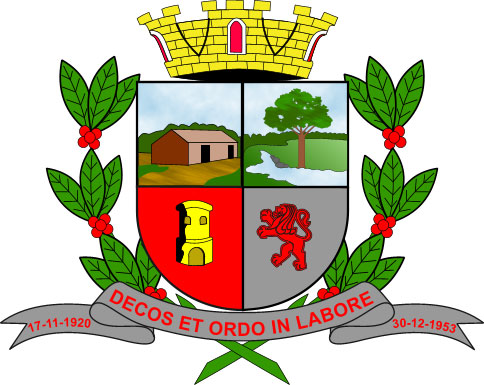
- Flag Coat of arms

- Location in São Paulo state

- Location in Brazil
- Coordinates: 20°44′02″S 49°34′48″W
- Country: Brazil
- Region: Southeast
- State: São Paulo
- Mesoregion: São José do Rio Preto
- Microregion: São José do Rio Preto

Area 500
  - Total: 149.9 km^{2} (57.9 sq mi)

Population (2020)
  - Total: 9,139
  - Density: 60.97/km^{2} (157.9/sq mi)
- Time zone: UTC−3 (BRT)
- Postal code: 15140-000
- Area code: +55 17
- Website: www.balsamo.sp.gov.br

Bálsamo (Portuguese for "balsam") is a municipality in the state of São Paulo, Brazil. The population is 9,139 (2020 est.) in an area of 149.9 km^{2} (57.9 sq mi). The municipality belongs to the Mesoregion and Microregion of São José do Rio Preto.

== Geography ==
=== Neighbouring municipalities ===
- Mirassolândia, Mirassol, Neves Paulista, Monte Aprazível and Tanabi

== Demographics ==
Historical population (municipality)
Year	Population	%±
1960	6,980	—
1970	5,746	−17.7%
1980	5,720	−0.5%
1991	6,771	18.4%
2000	7,340	8.4%
2010	8,160	11.2%
2022	9,596	17.6%

Obs: According to the 2000 IBGE Census, the population was 7,632, of which 6,338 are urban and 1,002 are rural. The average life expectancy was 73.28 years. The literacy rate was at 89.12%.

== Media ==
In telecommunications, the city was served by Telecomunicações de São Paulo. In July 1998, this company was acquired by Telefónica, which adopted the Vivo brand in 2012. The company is currently an operator of cell phones, fixed lines, internet (fiber optics/4G) and television (satellite and cable).

== See also ==
- List of municipalities in São Paulo
- Interior of São Paulo
