= Altair, São Paulo =

Municipality in the state of São Paulo in Brazil

Altair
- Municipality
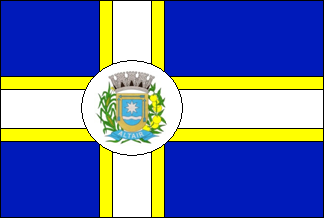
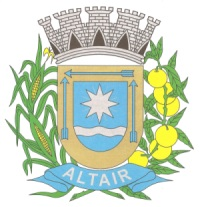
- Flag Coat of arms

- Location in São Paulo state

- Location in Brazil
- Coordinates: 20°31′27″S 49°3′34″W
- Country: Brazil
- Region: Southeast Brazil
- State: São Paulo

Area
  - Total: 313.86 km^{2} (121.18 sq mi)

Population (2020)
  - Total: 4,186
  - Density: 13.34/km^{2} (34.54/sq mi)
- Time zone: UTC−3 (BRT)
- Website: www.altair.sp.gov.br

Altair is a municipality in the state of São Paulo in Brazil. The population is 4,186 (2020 est.) in an area of 313.86 km^{2}. The neighboring municipalities are Icém to the north and Olímpia to the east.

== Demographics ==
Historical population (municipality)
Year	Population	%±
1960	2,733	—
1970	2,527	−7.5%
1980	2,318	−8.3%
1991	3,239	39.7%
2000	3,530	9.0%
2010	3,815	8.1%
2022	3,451	−9.5%

== Media ==
In telecommunications, the city was served by Companhia Telefônica Brasileira until 1973, when it began to be served by Telecomunicações de São Paulo. In July 1998, this company was acquired by Telefónica, which adopted the Vivo brand in 2012.

The company operations' cover cell phones services, fixed lines, internet (fiber optics/4G) and television (satellite and cable).

== See also ==
- List of municipalities in São Paulo
- Interior of São Paulo
