= Onda Verde =

- Municipality
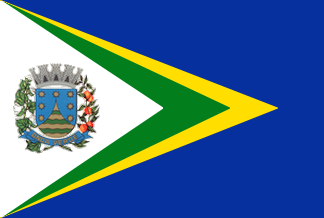
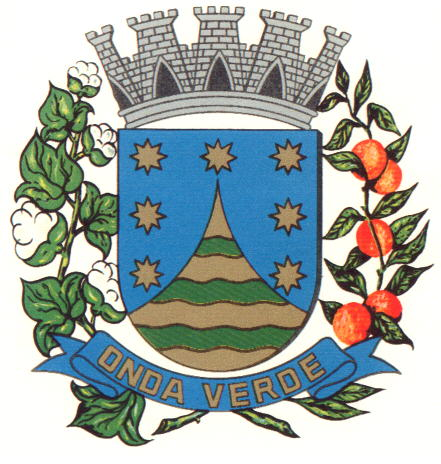
- Flag Coat of arms

- Location in São Paulo state

- Location in Brazil
- Coordinates: 20°36′00″S 49°17′43″W
- Country: Brazil
- Region: Southeast
- State: São Paulo
- Mesoregion: São José do Rio Preto
- Microregion: São José do Rio Preto

Area
  - Total: 242.3 km^{2} (93.6 sq mi)
- Elevation: 534 m (1,752 ft)

Population (2020)
  - Total: 4,422
  - Density: 18.25/km^{2} (47.27/sq mi)
- Time zone: UTC−3 (BRT)
- Postal code: 15450-000
- Area code: +55 17
- Website: www.ondaverde.sp.gov.br

Onda Verde (Portuguese for "green wave") is a municipality in the northern part of the state of São Paulo, Brazil. The population is 4,422 (2020 est.) in an area of 242.3 km^{2} (93.6 sq mi). The city belongs to the Microregion of São José do Rio Preto.

== Media ==
In telecommunications, the city was served by Telecomunicações de São Paulo. In July 1998, this company was acquired by Telefónica, which adopted the Vivo brand in 2012. The company is currently an operator of cell phones, fixed lines, internet (fiber optics/4G) and television (satellite and cable).

== See also ==
- List of municipalities in São Paulo
- Interior of São Paulo
