= Icém =

- Municipality
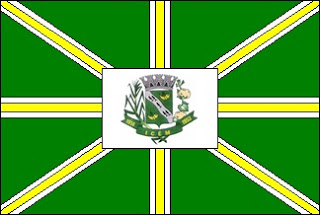
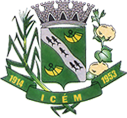
- Flag Coat of arms

- Location in São Paulo state

- Location in Brazil
- Coordinates: 20°20′28″S 49°11′52″W
- Country: Brazil
- Region: Southeast Brazil
- State: São Paulo

Area
  - Total: 362.59 km^{2} (140.00 sq mi)

Population (2020)
  - Total: 8,304
  - Density: 22.90/km^{2} (59.32/sq mi)
- Time zone: UTC−3 (BRT)
- Website: www.icem.sp.gov.br

Icém is a municipality in the northern part of the state of São Paulo in Brazil. The population is 8,304 (2020 est.) in an area of 362.59 km^{2} (140.00 sq mi). It is part of the Microregion of São José do Rio Preto. It is also known as Princesa do Vale, or "Princess of the Valley." Icem is situated near the important urban centers of São José do Rio Preto, Olímpia, Catanduva, and Mirassol. The Marimbondo Dam, which forms a big reservoir in the Rio Grande, is situated close to Icém.

== Transportation ==
Icém is served by two important highways, the BR-153, and SP-322. The nearest airport is 7 km away, in Fronteira, Minas Gerais.

== Infrastructure ==
Icém possesses a good basic infrastructure, that serves 100% of the population with electricity, water treatment and sewer and garbage collection. Communication and health care infrastructure is satisfactory as well. City streets are 100% paved and Icem has a low crime rate.

The nearby valley of the Grande river is a tourist destination, because of its natural environment, waterways and leisure activities.

Among Icém's many places of interest are: Lago de Marimbondo (Marimbondo Lake), Praia Mariana (Mariana Beach), Desertinho (Little Desert), Rio Grande (Big River), the Marimbondo hydroelectric dam, Complexo da Usininha (Usininha Complex), Vila da Usininha (Usininha Village), Mata da Água Doce (Sweetwater Bush), Cânions da Usininha (Usininha Canyons), Braço do Rio Grande (Big River Delta) and Córrego da Água Doce (Sweetwater Stream).

== Media ==
In telecommunications, the city was served by Companhia Telefônica Brasileira until 1973, when it began to be served by Telecomunicações de São Paulo. In July 1998, this company was acquired by Telefónica, which adopted the Vivo brand in 2012.

The company is currently an operator of cell phones, fixed lines, internet (fiber optics/4G) and television (satellite and cable).

== Geography ==
The Rio Grande, or "Big River," flows from the Maribondo Hydroelectric Plant's reservoir. Its current is fast and strong, and one can appreciate many interesting rock formations and fine-sand beaches on along its shores. The area has a wide variety of flora and fauna, which includes otters and 170 species of native fish.

== Agricultural tourism ==
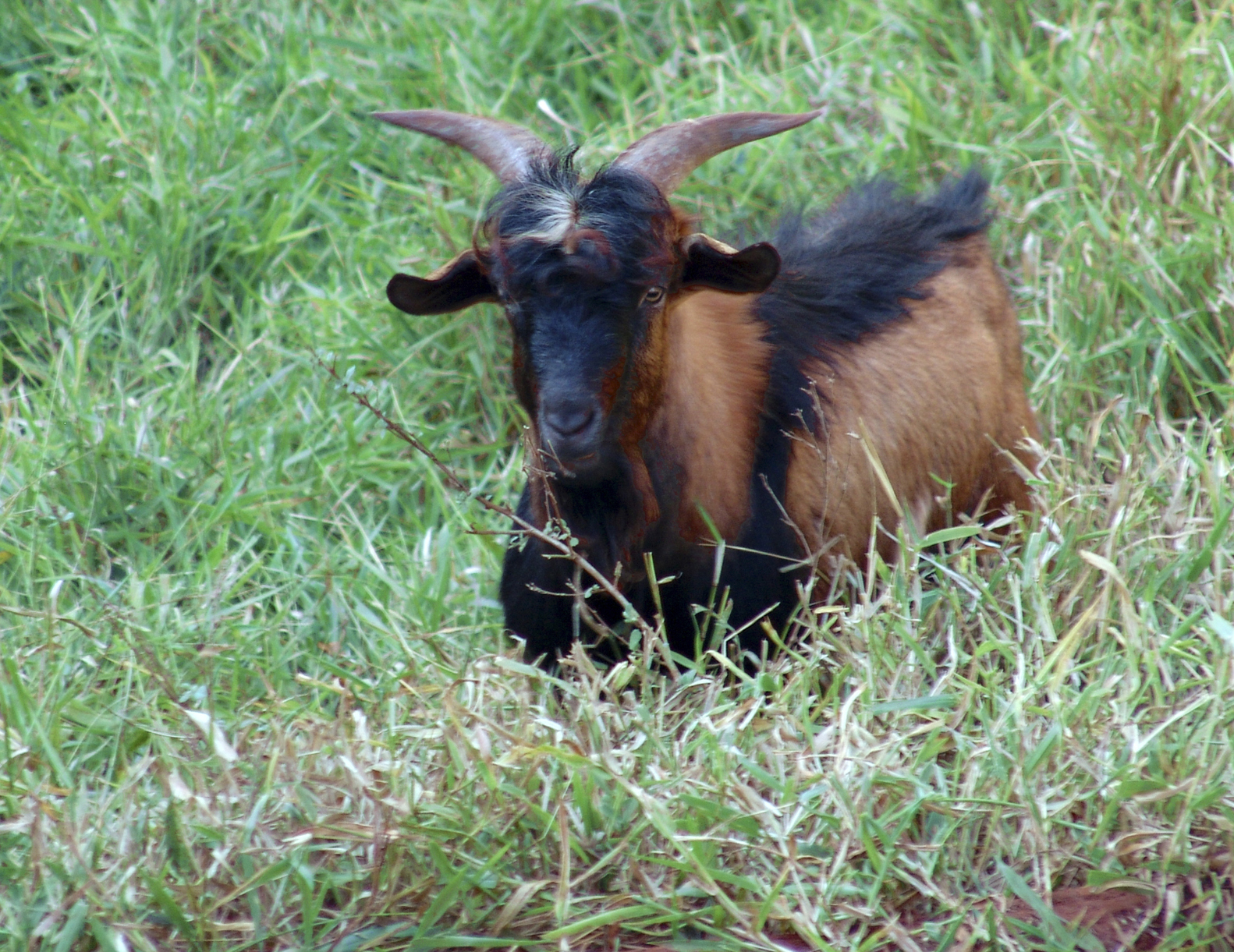
Goat in Usininha.

Icém's diverse farms, which produce agricultural goods and cattle, are popular among visitors.

== Events ==
The city of Icém is one of the region's better-known cultural centers. It offers events such as ballet, soccer and year-end festivities. Its main event is the rodeo-- Peão de Rodeio de Icém. Icém's soccer team, is tri-champion of the Copa Minas-São Paulo.

== See also ==
- List of municipalities in São Paulo
- Interior of São Paulo
