= Thermas dos Laranjais =

Water park in Olímpia, Brazil

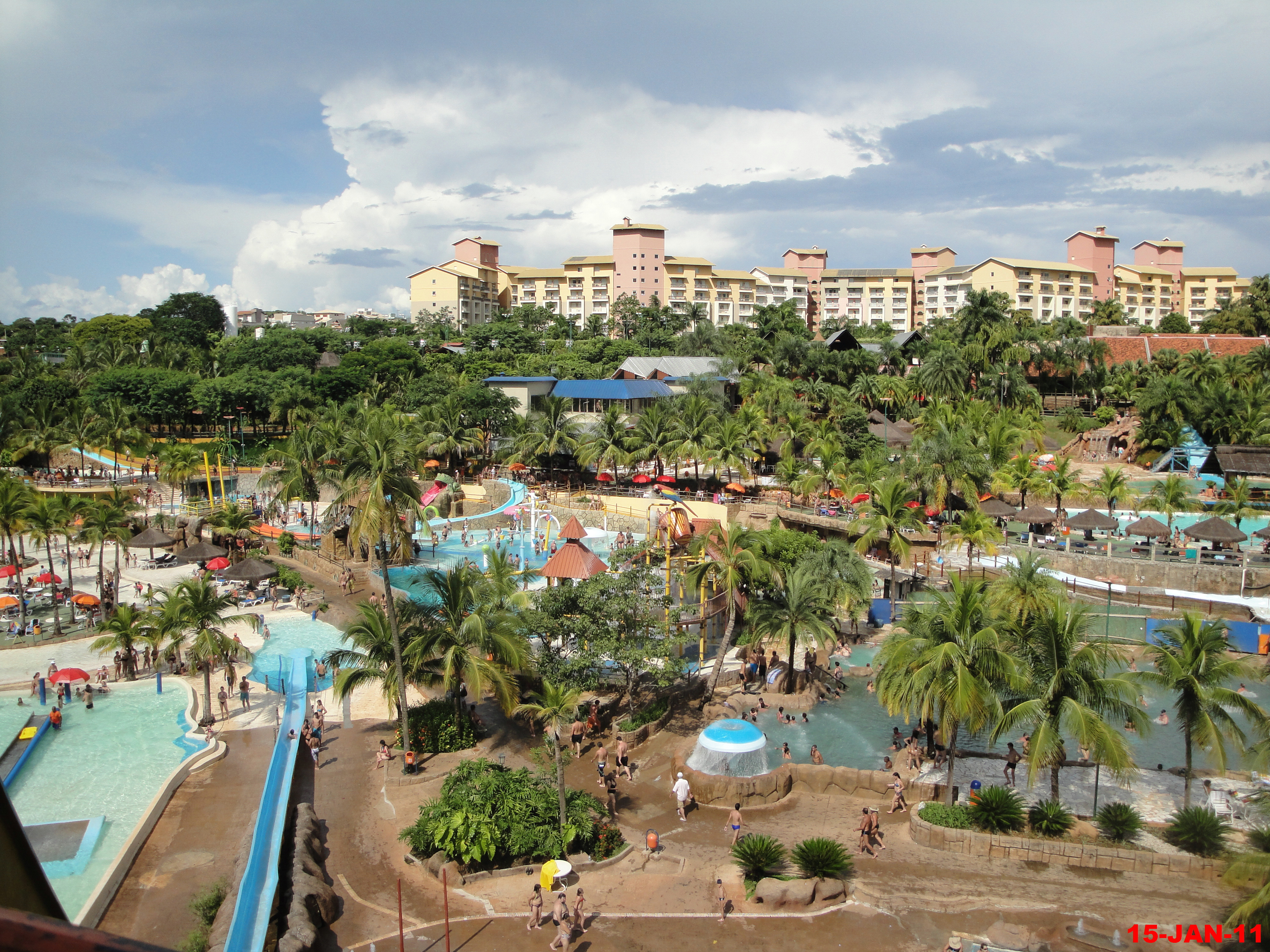
- Interactive map of Thermas dos Laranjais
- Location: Olímpia, São Paulo, Brazil
- Coordinates: 20.720°S 48.919°W
- Status: Operating
- Opened: July 28, 1985; 40 years ago
- Owner: Benito Benatti
- Operating season: Year-round
- Website: Official website

Thermas dos Laranjais is a water park located in the municipality of Olímpia, in the state of São Paulo, Brazil. It is the most visited water park in the Americas and the second in the world (2023), behind Chimelong Water Park in Guangzhou, China with more than two million annual visitors.

In 2015, the park was also considered the 11th best water park in the world by users of the TripAdvisor website; in 2017, it rose to 5th position. Thermal water tourism in Olímpia generates 350 million reais per year.

With more than 260 thousand square meters, Thermas dos Laranjais has the capacity to receive around 15 thousand visitors per day and has more than 50 attractions, such as water slide complexes, surf track, relaxation pools, lazy river, children's playground and two artificial beaches.

Thermas dos Laranjais is affiliated with several national and international water parks, theme parks, tourism and entertainment associations, being a member of the World Waterpark Association (WWA), and it is the first water park in Brazil to join the United Nations Global Compact, making a commitment to engage and promote its principles and respectively the Sustainable Development Goals.

== See also ==
- Hopi Hari
- Beach Park
