= Nova Granada =

- Municipality
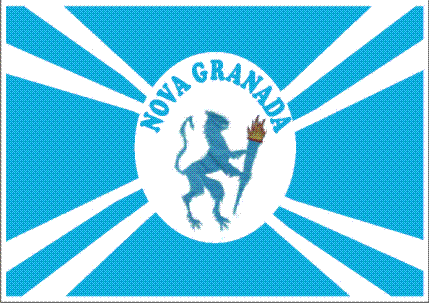
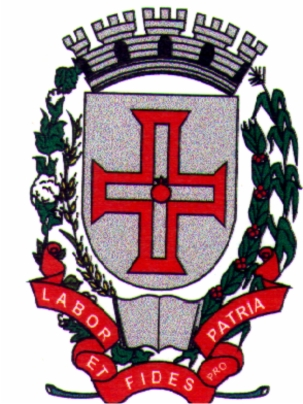
- Flag Coat of arms

- Location of Nova Granada
- Coordinates: 20°32′02″S 49°18′51″W
- Country: Brazil
- Region: Southeast
- State: São Paulo
- Mesoregion: São José do Rio Preto
- Established: 2009

Government
  - Mayor: Aparecido Donizete Martelli

Area
  - Total: 531.9 km^{2} (205.4 sq mi)
- Elevation: 542 m (1,778 ft)

Population (2020)
  - Total: 21,689
  - Density: 36.06/km^{2} (93.4/sq mi)
- Time zone: UTC−3 (BRT)
- Postal Code: 15440-000
- Area code: +55 17
- Website: Nova Granada's Prefecture

Nova Granada (Portuguese for "New Granada") is a municipality in the northern part of the state of São Paulo, Brazil. The population is 21,689 inhabitants (IBGE/2020), and the area is 533.49 km^{2}. The elevation is 542 m.

The city belongs to the Microregion of São José do Rio Preto.

== History ==
The expansion of coffee cultivation in the North of the state of São Paulo attracted many settlers who founded farming settlements as the population of the region increased. In 1911, Captain Francisco dos Santos founded a community near the Rio Grande settlement in the territory of São José do Rio Preto. Its original name was Vila Bela.

In a short time, the first houses were built around the chapel of Saint Benedict's patron. When the Police District was created, the village was renamed 'Pitangueiras', and its name was changed again to New Granada when it was elevated to a District of Peace in 1917.

According to the local chronicle, its name comes from the old Spanish immigrant settlers who came from Granada (Spain).

== Demographics ==
=== Indicators ===
- Population: 19,180 (IBGE/2010)
- Area: 531.9 km^{2} (166.5 sq mi)
- Population density: 36.06/km^{2} (/sq mi)
- Urbanization: 92.7% (2010)
- Sex ratio (Males to Females): 101.5 (2011)
- Birth rate: 15.5/1,000 inhab. (2009)
- Infant mortality: 20.3/1,000 births (2009)
- Homicide rate: 6.8/100 thousand ppl
- HDI: 0.790 (UNDP/2000)

All indicators are from SEADE and IBGE

== Economy ==
The Tertiary sector is the economic basis of Nova Granada. Commerce, services and administration corresponds to 62.3% of the city GDP. Industry is 16.2% of the GDP. The Primary sector is relevant, with 21.4%.

== Media ==
In telecommunications, the city was served by Telecomunicações de São Paulo. In July 1998, this company was acquired by Telefónica, which adopted the Vivo brand in 2012. The company is currently an operator of cell phones, fixed lines, internet (fiber optics/4G) and television (satellite and cable).

== See also ==
- List of municipalities in São Paulo
- Interior of São Paulo
