= Adolfo, São Paulo =

Adolfo
- Municipality
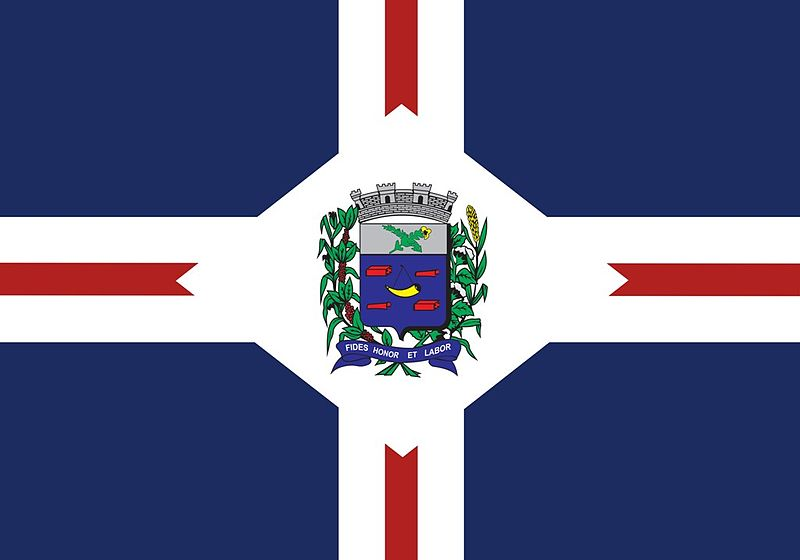
- Flag

- Location in São Paulo state

- Location in Brazil
- Coordinates: 21°14′8″S 49°38′38″W
- Country: Brazil
- Region: Southeast
- State: São Paulo

Area
  - Total: 211.1 km^{2} (81.5 sq mi)
- Elevation: 443 m (1,453 ft)

Population (2020)
  - Total: 3,554
  - Density: 16.84/km^{2} (43.60/sq mi)
- Time zone: UTC−3 (BRT)
- Postal code: 15230-000

Adolfo is a Brazilian municipality located in the interior of the state of São Paulo in the microregion of São José do Rio Preto. The population is 3,554 (2020 est.) in an area of 211.1 square kilometres (81.5 mi^{2}). The municipality was established in 1959.

== Demographics ==
Historical population (municipality)
Year	Population	%±
1960	3,774	—
1970	3,969	5.2%
1980	3,607	−9.1%
1991	3,272	−9.3%
2000	3,684	12.6%
2010	3,557	−3.4%
2022	4,351	22.3%

== Media ==
In telecommunications, the city was served by Companhia de Telecomunicações do Estado de São Paulo until 1973, when it began to be served by Telecomunicações de São Paulo. In July 1998, this company was acquired by Telefónica, which adopted the Vivo brand in 2012.

The company is currently an operator of cell phones, fixed lines, internet (fiber optics/4G) and television (satellite and cable).

== See also ==
- List of municipalities in São Paulo
- Interior of São Paulo
