= Zuba (name) =

Zuba or Zouba may refer to the following notable people:

Given name

- Zouba El-Klobatiyya (1917–1972), Egyptian dancer and actress

Surname

- André Zuba (born 1986), Brazilian footballer
- Hamid Zouba (1935–2022), Algerian football player and manager
- Maria Zuba (born 1951), Polish politician
