= Potirendaba =

- Municipality
- Municipality of Potirendaba
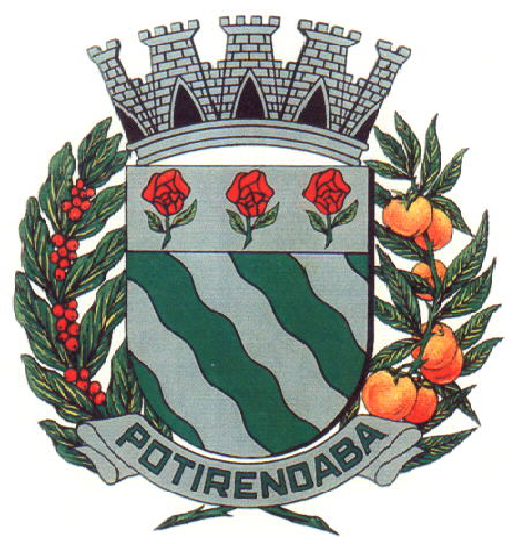
- Flag Coat of arms

- Location of Potirendaba
- Coordinates: 21°02′54″S 49°22′38″W
- Country: Brazil
- Region: Southeast
- State: São Paulo
- Established: 2009

Government
  - Mayor: Gislaine Montanari Franzotti

Area
  - Total: 342.4 km^{2} (132.2 sq mi)
- Elevation: 469 m (1,539 ft)

Population (2020)
  - Total: 17,516
  - Density: 45.12/km^{2} (116.9/sq mi)
- Time zone: UTC-3 (UTC-3)
  - Summer (DST): UTC-2 (UTC-2)
- Postal Code: 15105-000
- Area code: +55 17
- Website: Prefecture of Potirendaba

Potirendaba is a municipality in the state of São Paulo, Brazil. The city has 17,516 inhabitants (IBGE/2020) and an area of 342.4 km^{2}.

Potirendaba belongs to the Microregion and Mesoregion of São José do Rio Preto.

The name comes from the Tupi language and means "Land of flowers".

== History ==
There are various versions about the foundation and origin of Potirendaba. One of the versions tells that Manoel Ponciano had, around 1820, a farm in the region. In 1908, José Contador, a salesman, bought parts of the Três Rios farm, that belonged to Manoel Ponciano. At the time, the owners of the land were the Siqueira family, José Contador, João Francisco Pinto and the Manfredini family. A village was created with the time.

Another version tells that the brothers José and Joaquim Gonçalves de Souza were the first to arrive.

The creation of the city started in 1905, with the distribution of lands between the heirs of João Antônio de Siqueira.

In December, 1919, Potirendaba was established as a district of São José do Rio Preto. The district was elevated to city on December 26, 1925.

== Demographics ==
All data from SEADE and IBGE

- Population: 15,449 (IBGE/2010)
- Area: 342.4 km^{2} (166.5 sq mi)
- Population density: 45.12/km^{2} (2,451.5/sq mi)
- Urbanization: 89.9% (2010)
- Sex ratio (Males to Females): 103.1 (2011)
- Birth rate: 14.89/1,000 inhab. (2009)
- Infant mortality: 8.81/1,000 births (2009)
- Homicide rate: 8.9/100 thousand ppl
- HDI: 0.805 (UNDP/2000)

== Economy ==
The Tertiary sector is the economic basis of Potirendaba. Commerce, services and administration corresponds to 59.2% of the city GDP. Industry is 27.2% of the GDP. The Primary sector is relevant, with 13.4%.

== Media ==
In telecommunications, the city was served by Telecomunicações de São Paulo. In July 1998, this company was acquired by Telefónica, which adopted the Vivo brand in 2012. The company is currently an operator of cell phones, fixed lines, internet (fiber optics/4G) and television (satellite and cable).

== See also ==
- List of municipalities in São Paulo
- Interior of São Paulo
