= André Zuba =

Brazilian footballer (born 1986)

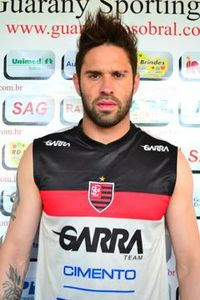
- Antoniassi in 2014

Personal information
- Full name: André Renato Antoniassi
- Date of birth: 23 June 1986 (age 40)
- Place of birth: Mirassol, Brazil
- Height: 1.77 m (5 ft 10 in)
- Position: Goalkeeper

Team information
- Current team: Portuguesa-MS

Youth career
- 2003: Santos
- 2004: Palmeiras

Senior career*
Years	Team	Apps	(Gls)
2005	Palmeiras	0	(0)
2005–2006	América-SP	0	(0)
2006	Remo	1	(0)
2007	Avaí	0	(0)
2007	América-SP	0	(0)
2008	Juventus-SP	0	(0)
2008	São Bento	0	(0)
2009	Santa Cruz	4	(0)
2009	Metropolitano	0	(0)
2010	Bragantino	0	(0)
2010	Catanduvense	0	(0)
2010	São José	0	(0)
2011	Santa Cruz	5	(0)
2012	União Madeira	0	(0)
2012	Botafogo-PB	5	(0)
2013	Caxias	12	(0)
2014	Guarany de Sobral	20	(0)
2014	Fortaleza	1	(0)
2015	Ypiranga-RS	0	(0)
2015	Comercial	6	(0)
2015–2016	Guarany de Sobral	16	(0)
2016	Mogi Mirim	0	(0)
2017	Mirassol	1	(0)
2017	Guarany de Sobral	4	(0)
2018	Mirassol	0	(0)
2019	Rio Preto	9	(0)
2019	Atlético Cearense	2	(0)
2019	AD Oliveirense	1	(0)
2020	Bahia de Feira	2	(0)
2020	Tupynambás	4	(0)
2020–2021	Estrela do Norte	13	(0)
2021	Rio Branco-ES	13	(0)
2022	Globo	17	(0)
2023	Monte Azul	7	(0)
2024–	Portuguesa-MS	0	(0)
- * Club domestic league appearances and goals as of 7 September 2021

André Renato Antoniassi, usually known as André Zuba (born 23 June 1986) is a Brazilian footballer who plays as a goalkeeper.

André Zuba previously played for Santa Cruz in the Copa do Brasil.
