= Jaci, São Paulo =

Jaci
- Municipality
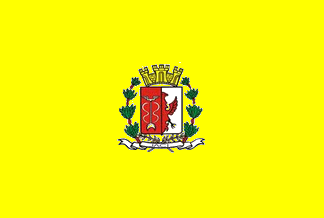
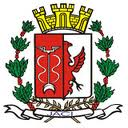
- Flag Coat of arms

- Location in São Paulo state

- Location in Brazil
- Coordinates: 20°52′56″S 49°34′12″W
- Country: Brazil
- Region: Southeast
- State: São Paulo
- Mesoregion: São Jose do Rio Preto
- Microregion: São Jose do Rio Preto

Area
  - Total: 145.13 km^{2} (56.04 sq mi)
- Elevation: 545 m (1,788 ft)

Population (2020)
  - Total: 7,196
  - Density: 49.58/km^{2} (128.4/sq mi)
- Time zone: UTC−3 (BRT)
- Website: www.jaci.sp.gov.br

Jaci is a municipality in the state of São Paulo in Brazil. The population is 7,196 (2020 est.) in an area of 145.13 km^{2}. The elevation is 545 m.

== Demographics ==
The 2000 population was 5,117, of which 3,973 were urban and 1,144 were rural. The life expectancy was 73.8 years. The literacy rate was at 87.42%.

=== Population ===
Year	Population
2000	5,117
2004	4,568
2015	6,486

== Media ==
In telecommunications, the city was served by Companhia de Telecomunicações do Estado de São Paulo until 1973, when it began to be served by Telecomunicações de São Paulo. In July 1998, this company was acquired by Telefónica, which adopted the Vivo brand in 2012.

The company is currently an operator of cell phones, fixed lines, internet (fiber optics/4G) and television (satellite and cable).

== See also ==
- List of municipalities in São Paulo
- Interior of São Paulo
