= Zuba (TV series) =

- Genre: Drama, Telenovela
- Country of origin: Zambia
- Original language: English
- No. of seasons: 8
- No. of episodes: 1,500

Production
- Running time: 22–24 minutes

Original release
- Network: Zambezi Magic

Zuba is a Zambian television drama series produced for Zambezi Magic, a channel owned by MultiChoice. The series premiered in 2017 and concluded in 2025 after eight seasons. It became one of Zambia’s longest-running and most successful local drama productions, with over 1,500 episodes. The show is also available for streaming on Showmax.

== Premise ==
The series follows the life of Zuba, a determined young woman from a rural village who moves to Lusaka in pursuit of a better life. What begins as a hopeful journey toward education and independence quickly turns into a dramatic struggle involving love, betrayal, social class conflict, and power dynamics within a wealthy urban family.
