= Guaraci, Paraná =

Coordinates: 22°58′22″S 51°39′00″W

- Municipality
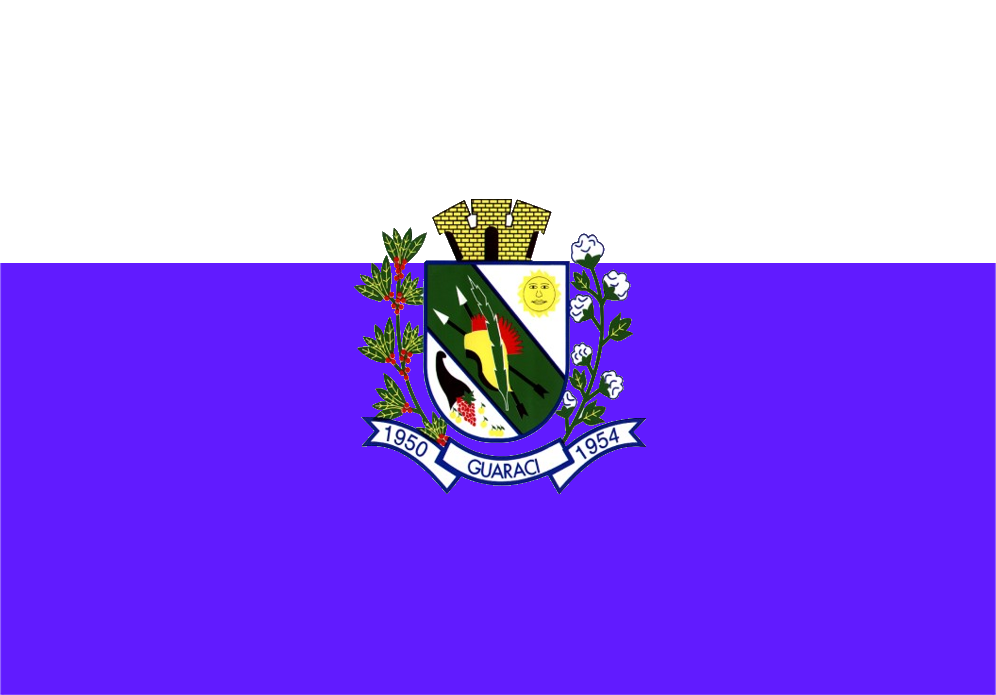
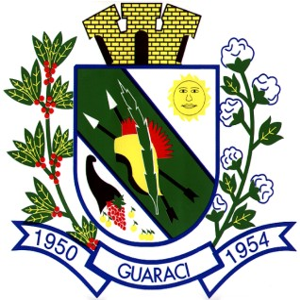
- Flag Coat of arms
- Interactive map of Guaraci, Paraná
- Country: Brazil
- Region: Southern
- State: Paraná
- Mesoregion: Noroeste Paranaense

Population (2020)
  - Total: 5,530
- Time zone: UTC−3 (BRT)

Guaraci is a municipality in the state of Paraná in the Southern Region of Brazil.

== See also ==
- List of municipalities in Paraná
