= ZubaBox =

A ZubaBox is a solar-powered internet café developed by Computer Aid International. It is constructed from used shipping containers and consists of a Pentium 4 PC (3 GHz+, 3GB RAM, 80GB+ HDD), 11 sets of peripherals (keyboards, mice, monitors), 2 desktop virtualisation cards, a ventilation fan for the server, low-power lights and an advanced power inverter. The solar panels used are poly-crystalline and the cell batteries are of Advanced Glass Mat type. It is named after the Nyanja word "Zuba", which means "Sun".

== Deployments ==
=== First Deployment ===
The first ever ZubaBox was deployed in a mission hospital in the village of Macha, Zambia and is used by the Johns Hopkins Malaria Research Institute. It is located 70 km from the nearest paved road and supports a mesh network with a radius of 1.5 km. The ZubaBox in Macha has a rota system which enables students to use it in the mornings, teachers and nurses to use it for professional training in the afternoon and is then open to adults to use thereafter.

=== Subsequent Deployments ===
Since then, there have been around 10 ZubaBoxes deployed in countries such as Nigeria, Zambia, Zimbabwe and Kenya.
