= Nova Aliança =

- Municipality
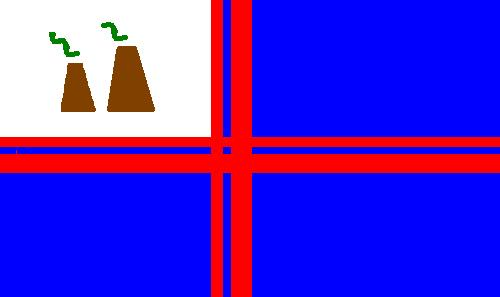
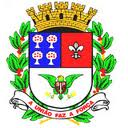
- Flag Coat of arms

- Location in São Paulo state

- Location in Brazil
- Coordinates: 21°00′57″S 49°29′45″W
- Country: Brazil
- Region: Southeast
- State: São Paulo

Area
  - Total: 217.5 km^{2} (84.0 sq mi)
- Elevation: 464 m (1,522 ft)

Population (2020)
  - Total: 7,068
  - Density: 32.50/km^{2} (84.17/sq mi)
- Time zone: UTC−3 (BRT)
- Postal code: 15210-000
- Area code: +55 17
- Website: www.novaalianca.sp.gov.br

Nova Aliança is a municipality in the state of São Paulo, Brazil. The population is 7,068 (2020 est.) in an area of 217.5 km^{2}. Nova Aliança belongs to the Mesoregion of São José do Rio Preto.

== History ==
In 1910, the families of Zeferino Gotardi, Jorge Galvão, Paschoal Proto, Gasparo Traldi and Luís Guilhermitti left São Joaquim da Barra, São Paulo, to settle in this region for its fertile soil which allowed for better farming. The name "Aliança" was chosen because the founders were originally from a farm called "Bela Aliança".

In the early twentieth century, the town of Monte Belo in the region faced rapid growth, most of which was in the agricultural sector. The population reached an estimated 500 inhabitants and urban development including homes and judicial buildings. The growth was soon interrupted by a malaria epidemic that killed many people.

The municipality was created by state law in 1944.

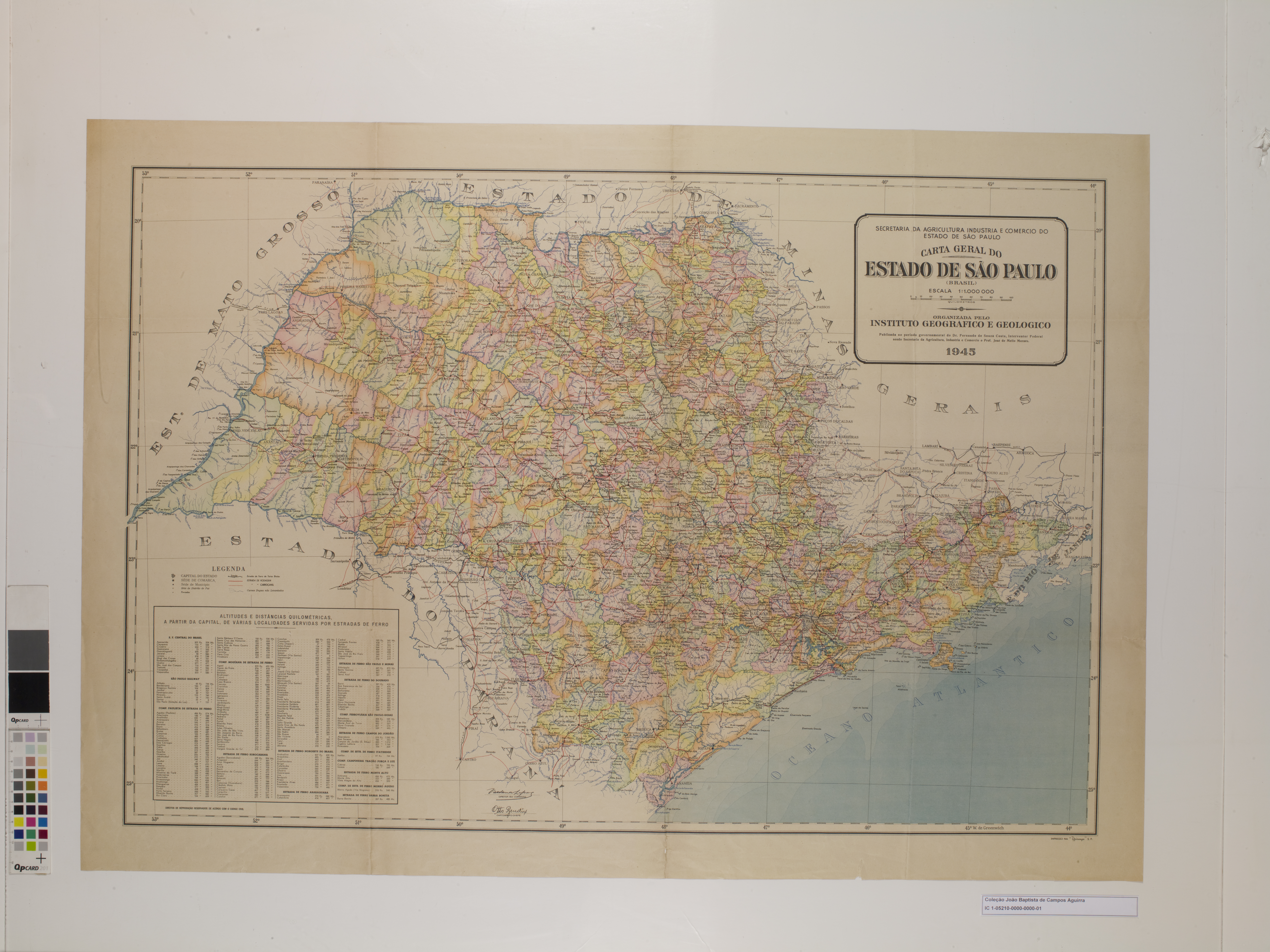
Map of the state of São Paulo (1944).

== Government ==
- Mayor: Jurandir Barbosa de Moraes (2021-)
- Deputy mayor: Silvia Renata Patini Alves

=== Past mayors of Nova Aliança ===
In chronological order:

- João Sperandéo - January 1945 to December 1945
- Dulcídio Siqueira -January 1946 to March 1947
- Simão Daud - April 1947 to December 1947
- Francisco Pereira dos Santos - January 1948 to July 1951
- João Sperandéo - July 1951 to December 1951
- Luiz Antonio Fleury - January 1952 to December 1955
- Benedito Soares Dias - January 1956 to December 1959
- Chicrala Boulos - January 1960 to December 1963
- Jorge Ayruth - January 1964 to January 1969
- Chicrala Boulos - February 1969 to January 1973
- Demétrio Birelli - February 1973 to January 1977
- Waldemar Pala - February 1977 to January 1983
- Alfredo Gonçalves de Matos - February 1983 to January 1989
- Demétrio Birelli - February 1989 to December 1992
- José Augusto Fernandes - January 1993 to December 1996
- Jurandir Barbosa de Moraes - January 1997 to December 2000
- Jurandir Barbosa de Moraes - January 2001 to December 2004
- Augusto Donizetti Fajan - January 2005 to December 2012
- Jurandir Barbosa de Moraes - January 2013 to December 2016
- Augusto Donizetti Fajan - January 2017 to December 31, 2019

== Population ==
Year	Population
2000	4,768
2004	5,062
2010	5,891
2015	6,555

== Media ==
In telecommunications, the city was served by Telecomunicações de São Paulo. In July 1998, this company was acquired by Telefónica, which adopted the Vivo brand in 2012. The company is currently an operator of cell phones, fixed lines, internet (fiber optics/4G) and television (satellite and cable).

== See also ==
- List of municipalities in São Paulo
- Interior of São Paulo
