= Olímpia =

- Municipality
- Municipality of Olímpia
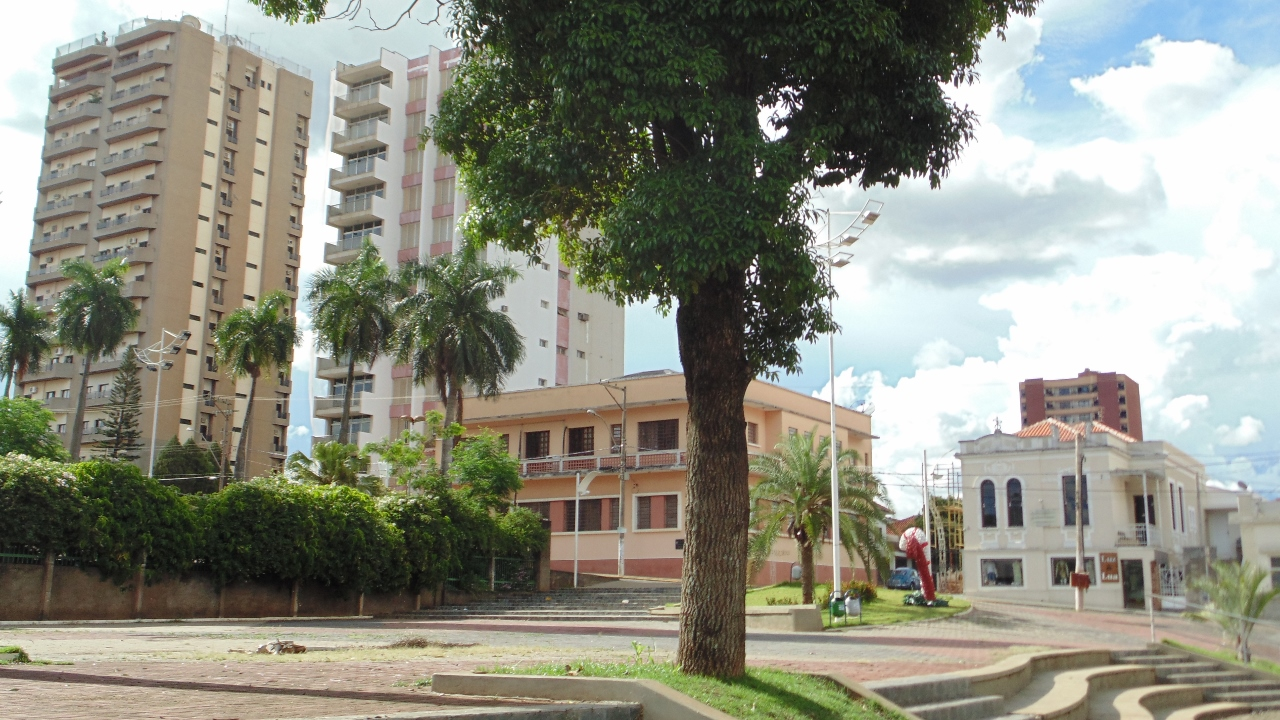
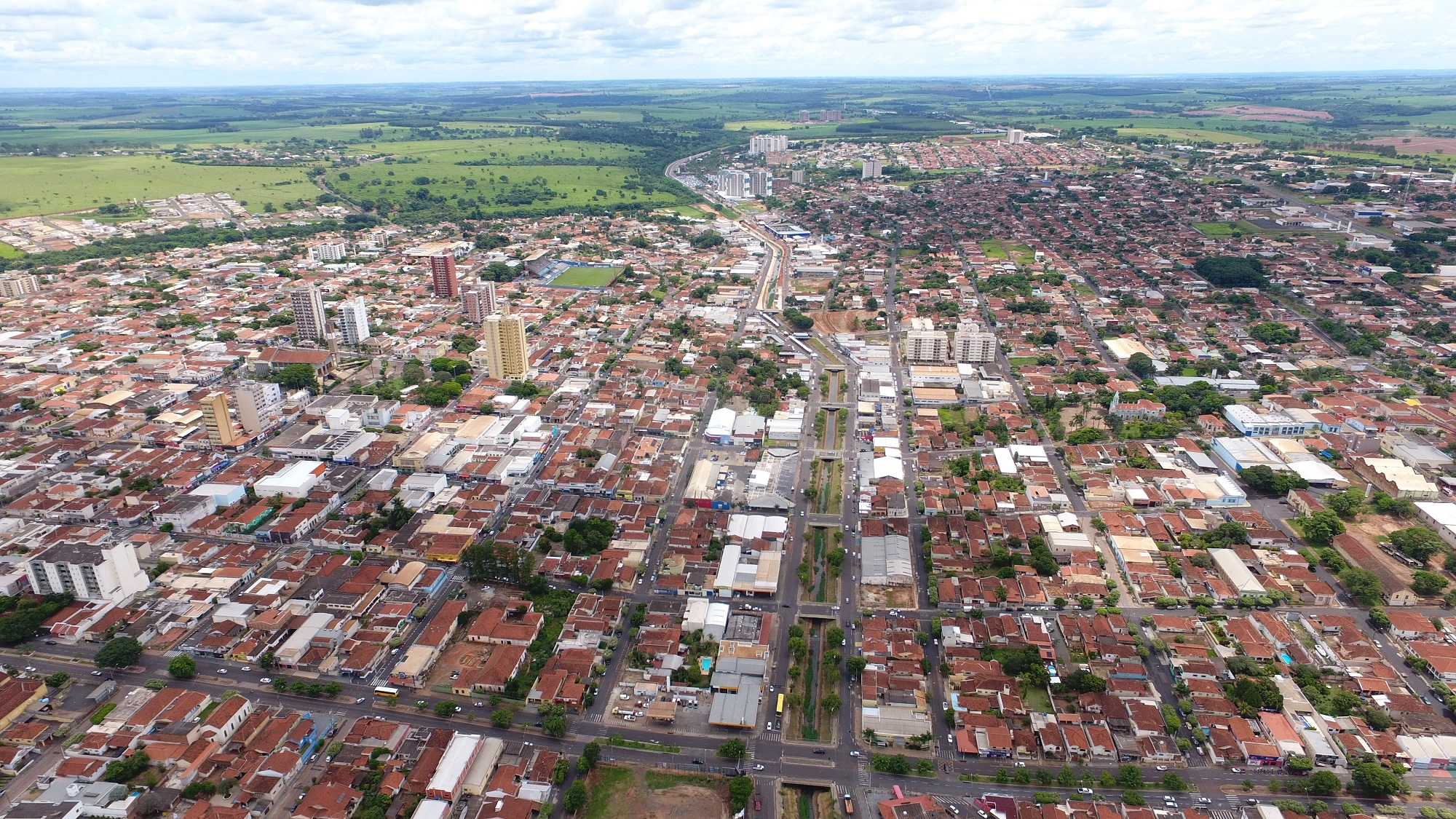
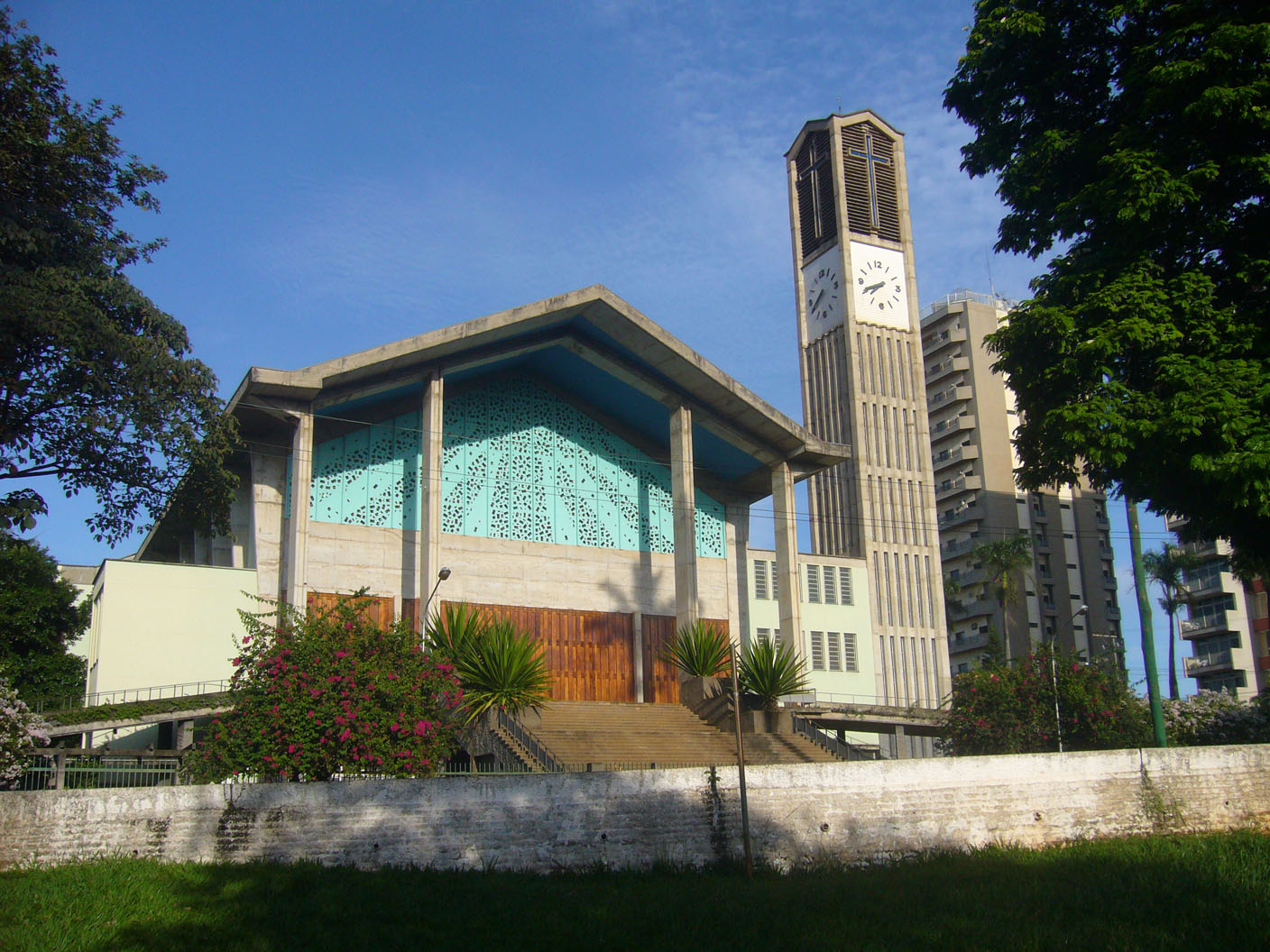
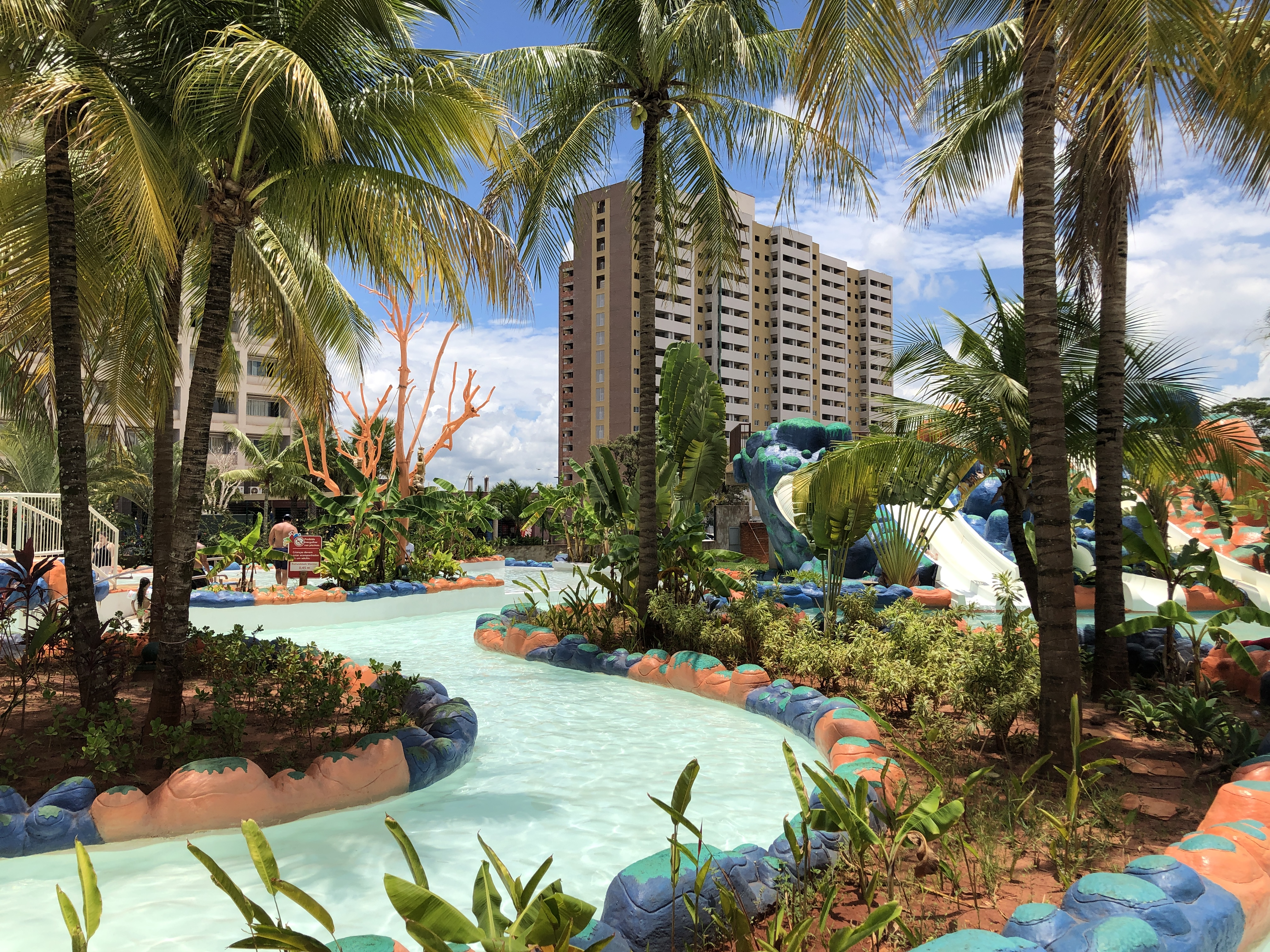
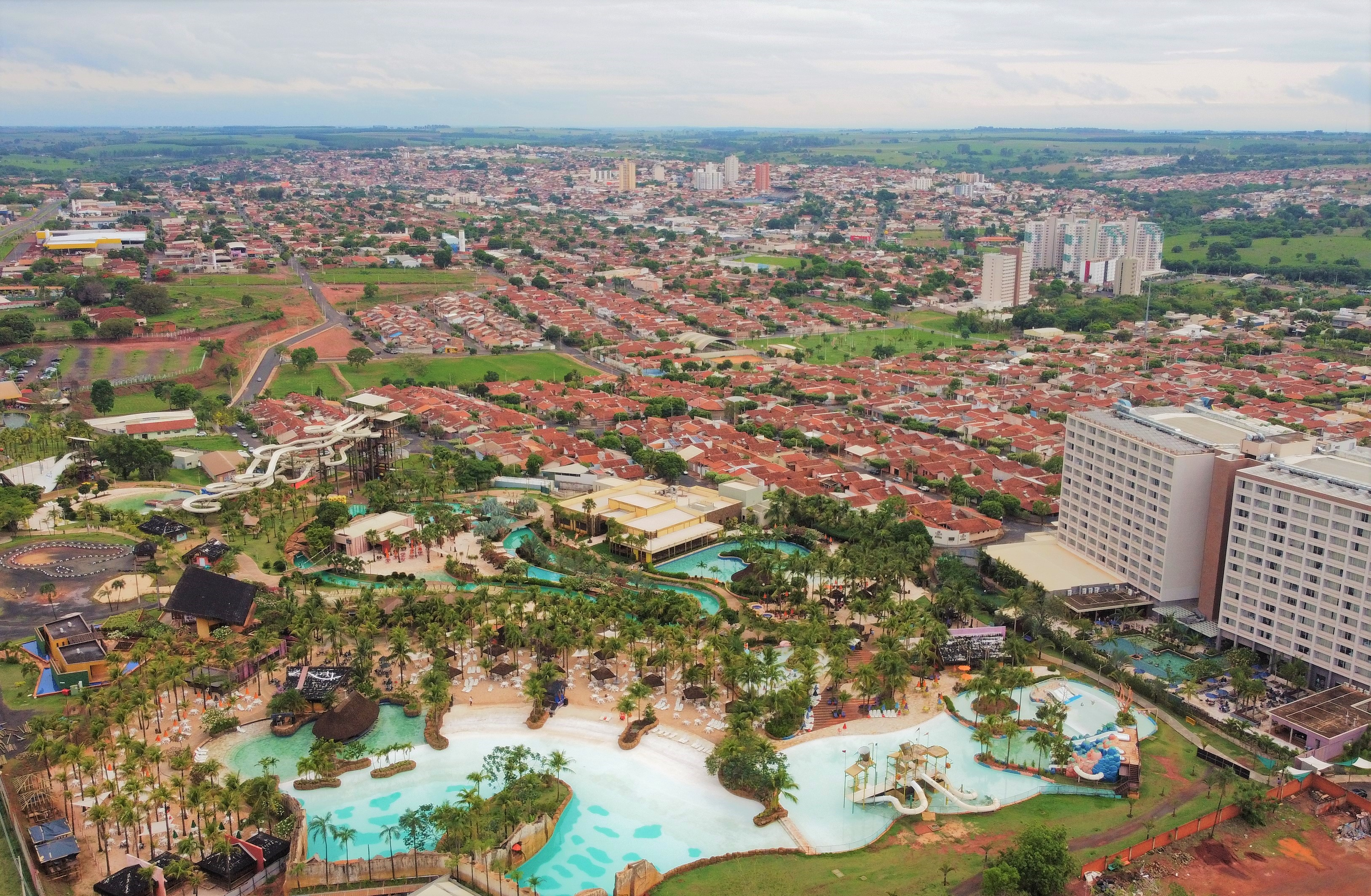
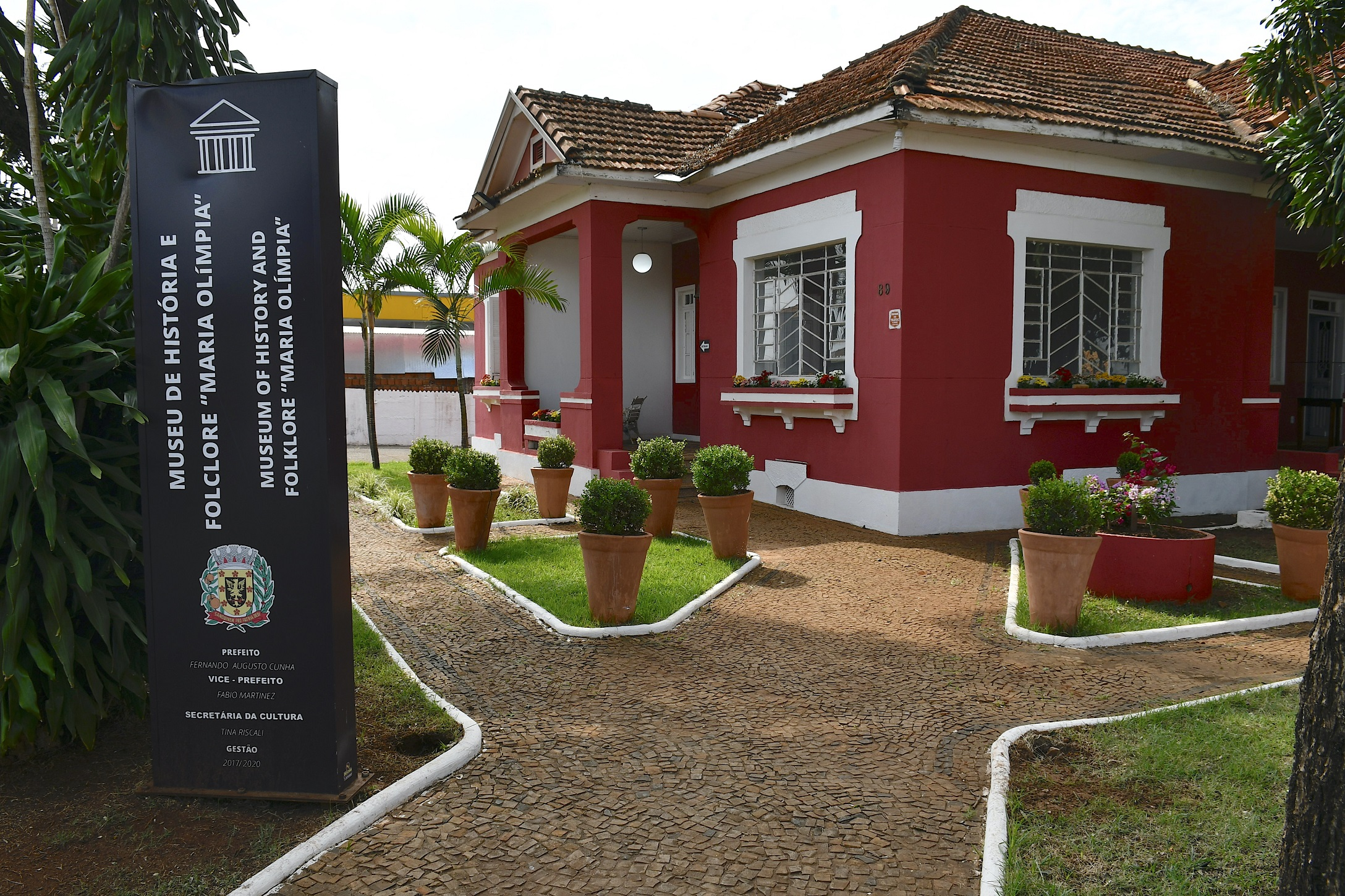

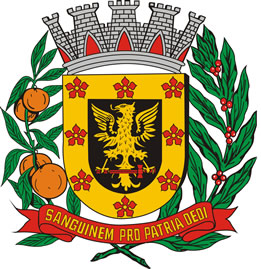
- Flag Coat of arms
- Nicknames: Folklore's National Capital, The Lady Girl City
- Location in São Paulo
- Coordinates: 20°44′14″S 48°54′53″W
- Country: Brazil
- Region: Southeast
- State: São Paulo
- Mesoregion: São José do Rio Preto
- Established: 1917

Government
  - Mayor: Geninho Zuliani

Area
  - Total: 802.6 km^{2} (309.9 sq mi)
- Elevation: 506 m (1,660 ft)

Population (2020)
  - Total: 55,130
  - Density: 62.32/km^{2} (161.4/sq mi)
- Time zone: UTC−3 (BRT)
- Postal Code: 15400-000
- Area code: +55 17
- Website: Olímpia's Prefecture

Olímpia is a municipality in the state of São Paulo, Brazil, in the Microregion of São José do Rio Preto. As of the 2020 census, the population of the city was 55,130 inhabitants. The city has a total area of 802.6 km^{2} (309.9 mi^{2}).

== History ==
The oldest archaeological evidence in the territory dates back to the centuries 9th or 10th. In the early 1990s, workers of construction found four funerary urns containing bones, bead necklaces, and pots inside, which was later linked to the Tupi, and Macro Je people. Although it is known that Latin America was inhabited by nomadic tribes, this is actually the oldest evidence of human presence in the area prior to European colonization.

In the 19th century, the foundation of Olimpia (formerly knows as Fazenda Olhos d'Água, and then, Vila Olímpia) is related to the coffee industry during the Empire of Brazil, when plantation owners meet the demand of labor.

With the exhaustion of the gold mines, people abandoned their previous sites in search of a better one. The new settlers focus on the unexplored areas to dedicate themselves to agriculture and cattle raising.

The first reports indicate that a farmer named ''Antônio Joaquim dos Santos'' was the first settler to establish a farm in the 19th century. He named his property as ''Fazenda Olhos D'Água'' (Portuguese for ''Water holes farm'') due to the amount of water springs in the area.

The increasing numbers of migrant colonials settling in the area and the need for a collectivized farming led the local community the decision to create the village. In 1903, the landowners invitated the English immigrants Robert John Reid, and William Leatherbarrow, to separate the lands and establish the city.

The town was elevated to a district of Barretos on December 18, 1906, and named as "Vila Olímpia" in honor to Maria Olímpia Rodrigues Vieira, who was the daughter of Antônio Olímpio Rodrigues Vieira. Vieira was one of the founders of the city.

Nowadays, a range of buildings reveal the timeline of Olimpia's history and were declared historical landmarks, such as the old railway station, and the first hospital of the city ''Beneficiência Portuguesa''.

The city was separated from Barretos on December 7, 1917.

In July 2014, it was approved by the São Paulo State Legislative Assembly, a bill that turned Olímpia into a Touristic Municipality.

=== Toponym ===
The name of the city comes from ''Maria Olímpia Rodrigues Vieira'', daughter of one of the men who founded the city.

== Tourism ==
Tourism is one of the main drivers of Olímpia's economy and is primarily associated with its thermal waters and popular culture. In addition to water parks such as Thermas dos Laranjais and Hot Beach, the municipality offers cultural attractions including the Museum of Folklore, the ECO Cultural Station of Olímpia, the Maria Olímpia Museum of History and Archaeology, and the Folklore Festival grounds. These attractions connect water-based recreation with local history, archaeology, religious heritage and the folkloric traditions that gave Olímpia the title of National Capital of Folklore.

== Economy ==
The service sector is the largest employer. Trade and Services accounted 65.5%, followed by the Industry representing 26% and the primary sector accounting 8.2% of the GDP.

=== Thermas dos Laranjais ===
Olimpia is home to Thermas dos Laranjais water park, one of the most visited water parks in the world. The park was opened in 1987 and is home to the largest complex of thrilling waterslides in Brazil occupying an area of 358.797 sq. yd. (300 km^{2}).

It boasts more than 55 attractions. These include waterslides, surfing facilities, pools, rivers, and family-friendly offerings.

According to Themed Entertainment Association (TEA), by 2019 the park received 1.8 million visitors.

== Culture ==
Olímpia is known as ''The capital of Folklore'' promoting every year the National Folklore Festival of Olimpia, when Brazilian folklore groups meet themselves to perform on stage their local dances ranging from Gaucho tradition groups to Amazonian dances.

== Media ==
In telecommunications, the city was served by Companhia Telefônica Brasileira until 1973, when it began to be served by Telecomunicações de São Paulo. In July 1998, this company was acquired by Telefónica, which adopted the Vivo brand in 2012.

The company is currently an operator of cell phones, fixed lines, internet (fiber optics/4G) and television (satellite and cable).

== Sports ==
The city is home to Olímpia Futebol Clube.

== Transportation ==
- SP-322 - Rodovia Armando de Salles Oliveira
- SP-425 - Rodovia Assis Chateaubriand

== Religion ==
Christianity is present in the city as follows:

=== Catholic Church ===
The Catholic church in the municipality is part of the Roman Catholic Diocese of Barretos.

=== Protestant Church ===
The most diverse evangelical beliefs are present in the city, mainly Pentecostal, including the Assemblies of God in Brazil (the largest evangelical church in the country), Christian Congregation in Brazil, among others. These denominations are growing more and more throughout Brazil.

== See also ==
- List of municipalities in São Paulo
- Interior of São Paulo
