= Mirassolândia =

- Municipality
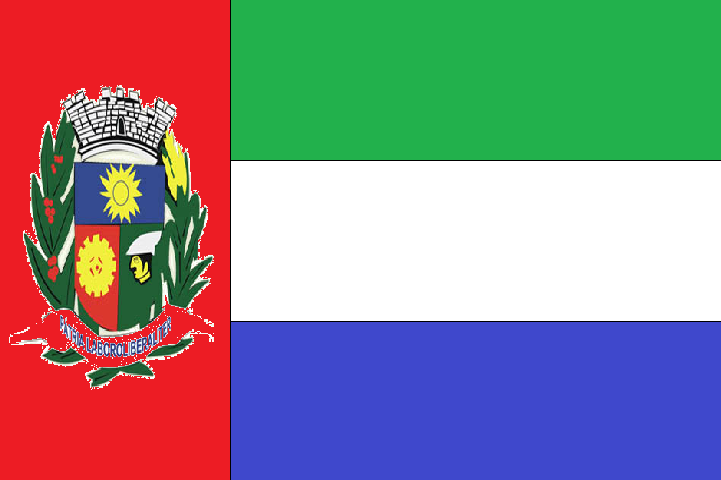
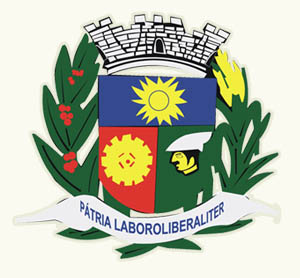
- Flag Coat of arms

- Location of Mirassolândia

- Location within Brazil
- Coordinates: 20°37′00″S 49°27′50″W
- Country: Brazil
- Region: Southeast
- State: São Paulo
- Mesoregion: São José do Rio Preto

Area
  - Total: 166.2 km^{2} (64.2 sq mi)

Population (2020)
  - Total: 4,919
  - Density: 29.60/km^{2} (76.66/sq mi)
- Time zone: UTC−3 (BRT)
- Postal Code: 15145-000
- Area code: +55 17
- Website: Prefecture of Mirassolândia

Mirassolândia is a municipality in the state of São Paulo, Brazil. The population is 4,919 inhabitants and the area is 166.2 km^{2}.

Mirassolândia is located in the north of São Paulo state, 25 km from the city of São José do Rio Preto. The area is essentially rural.

== Media ==
In telecommunications, the city was served by Companhia de Telecomunicações do Estado de São Paulo until 1973, when it began to be served by Telecomunicações de São Paulo. In July 1998, this company was acquired by Telefónica, which adopted the Vivo brand in 2012.

The company is currently an operator of cell phones, fixed lines, internet (fiber optics/4G) and television (satellite and cable).

== See also ==
- List of municipalities in São Paulo
- Interior of São Paulo
