= List of dialling codes in Brazil =

Country Code: +55
International Call Prefix: 00 then Carrier Code
Trunk Prefix: 0 then Carrier Code

This article contains a list of area codes in Brazil for telephone dialing. The area codes are distributed geographically, citing the main cities in each area.

Local phone numbers in Brazil observe an eight-digit pattern (dddd-dddd) for landlines and nine digits (ddddd-dddd) for mobile phones. Mobile numbers share the same geographic area codes as landlines, but the first digit differentiates them. Landline numbers start with digits 2 through 5. Initial digits 6 through 9 are reserved for mobile numbers, but as of 2017 all mobile numbers in Brazil start with the digit 9. (There was an exception for some iDEN mobile lines operated by Nextel, which were eight digits long and started with 7, disestablished in 2018.)

Area codes have two digits, and are often notated between parentheses: (aa) nnnn-nnnn. For long-distance calls within Brazil, a zero (0) must be dialed first, then a carrier selection code (for example, 21 for Embratel and 41 for TIM Brasil), then the two-digit area code, then the local number. For example, to call the number 2222-2222 in Fortaleza (area code 85) using Oi (selection code 31) as the chosen carrier, one would dial 0 31 85 2222 2222.

For international calls to Brazil, the international access code used in the calling country must be dialed (for example, 011 from the United States and Canada, 00 from Europe and most other countries, or the actual "+" sign from some mobile networks), then Brazil's country code 55, then the two-digit area code, then the local eight- or nine-digit number. For example, to call the number 3333-3333 in Rio de Janeiro (area code 21) from Europe, one would dial 00 55 21 3333 3333.

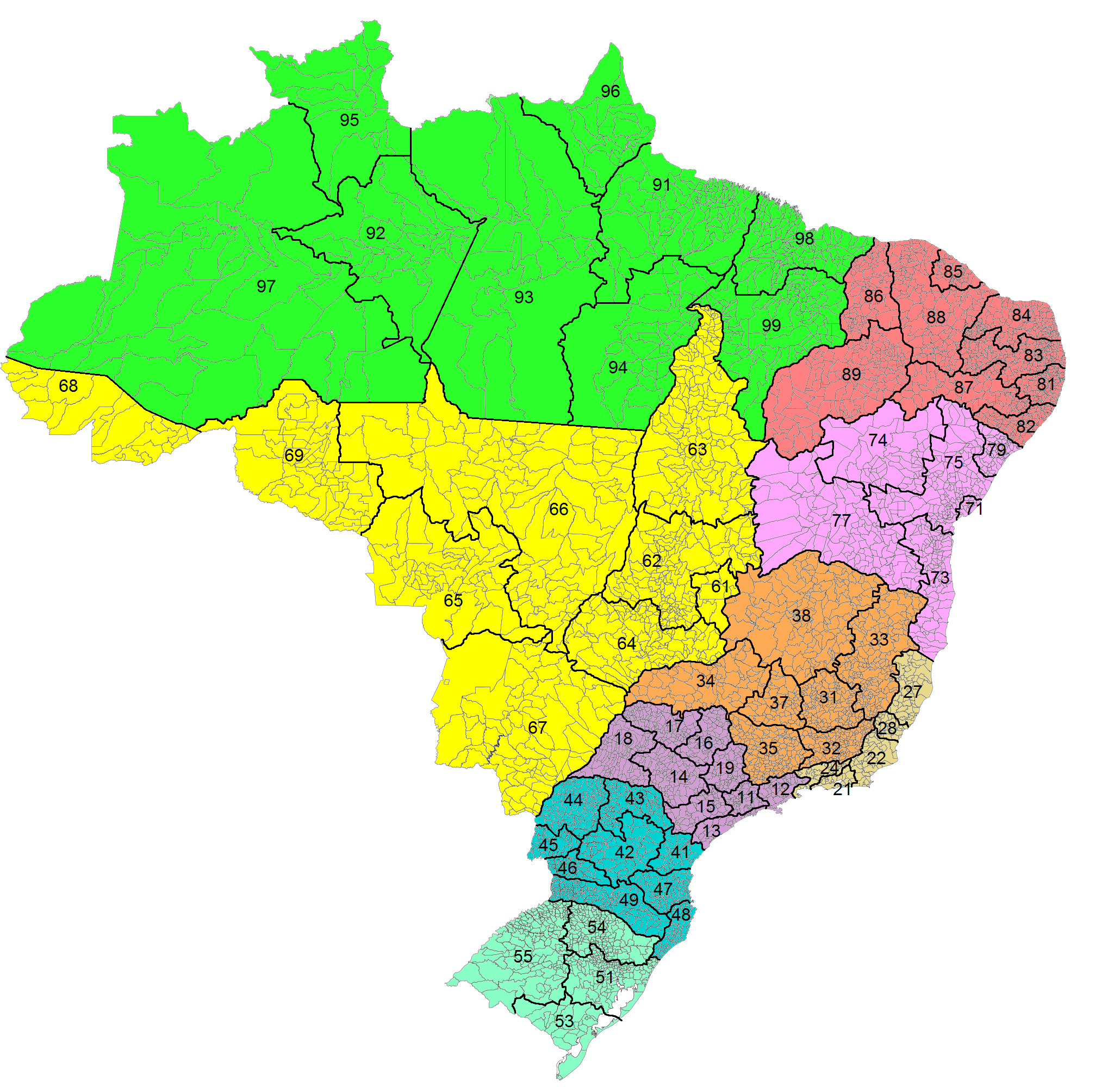
Map of Brazilian area code ranges by state

== 1 State of São Paulo ==
- 11 – São Paulo metropolitan area
- 12 – Vale do Paraíba (São José dos Campos, Taubaté, Guaratinguetá) and Northern coast (Ubatuba, São Sebastião)
- 13 – Baixada Santista (Santos, São Vicente, Guarujá) and Southern coast (Registro, Itanhaém)
- 14 – Central (Bauru, Marília, Botucatu)
- 15 – Southwest (Sorocaba, Itapetininga)
- 16 – Northeast (Ribeirão Preto, Franca, São Carlos)
- 17 – Northwest (São José do Rio Preto, Catanduva, Barretos)
- 18 – West (Presidente Prudente, Araçatuba)
- 19 – Central-South (Campinas, Piracicaba, Limeira)

== 2 States of Rio de Janeiro and Espírito Santo ==
=== Rio de Janeiro (21, 22 and 24) ===
- 21 – Greater Rio de Janeiro and Teresópolis
- 22 – East and North (Campos dos Goytacazes, Cabo Frio, Nova Friburgo)
- 23 – reserved
- 24 – West (Petrópolis, Volta Redonda, Angra dos Reis)
- 25 and 26 – reserved

=== Espírito Santo (27 and 28) ===
- 27 – Central and North (Vitória, Linhares, Colatina)
- 28 – South (Cachoeiro de Itapemirim, Castelo)
- 29 – reserved

== 3 State of Minas Gerais ==
- 31 – Central (Greater Belo Horizonte, Sete Lagoas, Ipatinga)
- 32 – Southeast (Juiz de Fora, Muriaé, Barbacena)
- 33 – East and Northeast (Governador Valadares, Teófilo Otoni)
- 34 – West (Uberlândia, Uberaba, Patos de Minas)
- 35 – Southwest (Poços de Caldas, Varginha, Pouso Alegre)
- 36 – reserved
- 37 – Central-West (Divinópolis)
- 38 – North (Montes Claros, Diamantina)
- 39 – reserved

== 4 States of Paraná and Santa Catarina ==
=== Paraná (41–46) ===
- 41 – Greater Curitiba and coast (Paranaguá)
- 42 – Central-South (Ponta Grossa, Guarapuava)
- 43 – Northeast (Londrina, Apucarana)
- 44 – Northwest (Maringá, Umuarama)
- 45 – West (Foz do Iguaçu, Cascavel)
- 46 – Southwest (Francisco Beltrão, Pato Branco)

=== Santa Catarina (47–49) ===
- 47 – Northeast (Joinville, Blumenau, Itajaí)
- 48 – Greater Florianópolis and South (Criciúma, Tubarão)
- 49 – Central and West (Lages, Chapecó)

== 5 State of Rio Grande do Sul ==
- 51 – Greater Porto Alegre, Central-South (Santa Cruz do Sul), Northern coast (Torres)
- 52 – reserved
- 53 – South (Pelotas, Rio Grande, Bagé)
- 54 – North (Caxias do Sul, Passo Fundo)
- 55 – Central, West and Northwest (Santa Maria, Uruguaiana, Ijuí)
- 56–59 – reserved

== 6 Central-West Region and states of Tocantins, Acre and Rondônia ==
=== Federal District (part of 61) ===
- 61 – entire Federal District (Brasília) and surrounding area of Goiás state

=== Goiás (part of 61, plus 62 and 64) ===
- 61 – area surrounding Brasília
- 62 – Central and North (Greater Goiânia, Anápolis)
- 64 – South and West (Rio Verde, Itumbiara, Catalão)

=== Tocantins (63) ===
- 63 – entire State of Tocantins (capital city Palmas)

=== Mato Grosso (65 and 66) ===
- 65 – Southwest (Cuiabá, Cáceres)
- 66 – East and North (Rondonópolis, Sinop)

=== Mato Grosso do Sul (67) ===
- 67 – entire State of Mato Grosso do Sul (capital city Campo Grande)

=== Acre (68) ===
- 68 – entire State of Acre (capital city Rio Branco)

=== Rondônia (69) ===
- 69 – entire State of Rondônia (capital city Porto Velho)

== 7 States of Bahia and Sergipe ==
=== Bahia (71, 73–75, 77) ===
- 71 – Greater Salvador
- 72 – reserved
- 73 – South (Ilhéus, Itabuna, Porto Seguro, Jequié)
- 74 – Northwest (Juazeiro)
- 75 – Northeast (Feira de Santana)
- 76 – reserved
- 77 – Southwest and West (Vitória da Conquista, Barreiras)
- 78 – reserved (formerly used by Embratel for maritime telecommunications and for the RENPAC dialled data communication system)

=== Sergipe (79) ===
- 79 – entire State of Sergipe (capital city Aracaju)

== 8 Northeast Region ==
=== Pernambuco (81 and 87) ===
- 81 – East (Greater Recife, Caruaru, Fernando de Noronha)
- 87 – Central and West (Petrolina, Garanhuns)

=== Alagoas (82) ===
- 82 – entire State of Alagoas (capital city Maceió)

=== Paraíba (83) ===
- 83 – entire State of Paraíba (capital city João Pessoa)

=== Rio Grande do Norte (84) ===
- 84 – entire State of Rio Grande do Norte (capital city Natal)

=== Ceará (85 and 88) ===
- 85 – Greater Fortaleza
- 88 – Central, West and South (Juazeiro do Norte, Sobral)

=== Piauí (86 and 89) ===
- 86 – North (Teresina, Parnaíba)
- 89 – Central and South (Picos, Floriano)

== 9 North Region and the state of Maranhão ==
=== Pará (91, 93 and 94) ===
- 91 – Northeast (Greater Belém, Capanema)
- 93 – Central and West (Santarém, Altamira)
- 94 – Southeast (Marabá, Carajás)

=== Amazonas (92 and 97) ===
- 92 – Northeast (Greater Manaus, Itacoatiara, Parintins)
- 97 – Central, South and West (Coari, Tabatinga, Humaitá)

=== Roraima (95) ===
- 95 – entire State of Roraima (capital city Boa Vista)

=== Amapá (96) ===
- 96 – entire State of Amapá (capital city Macapá)

=== Maranhão (98 and 99) ===
- 98 – North (Greater São Luís, Pinheiro)
- 99 – Central and South (Imperatriz, Caxias)

== Exceptions ==
In a few exceptional cases, some area codes span state borders to cater for tightly integrated interstate communities:

- Two villages straddle the Preto river on the Minas Gerais–Rio de Janeiro state border. The village of Maringá (not to be confused with the homonymous large city in the State of Paraná) lies partly in the Rio de Janeiro municipality of Itatiaia and partly in the Minas Gerais municipality of Bocaina de Minas, while the village of Porto das Flores is divided between the municipalities of Rio das Flores (Rio de Janeiro) and Belmiro Braga (Minas Gerais). Both sides of these villages use the Rio de Janeiro area code 24. Outside these villages, their respective Minas Gerais municipalities use the proper regional area code 32.
- Two border cities in the State of Paraná are contiguous with larger cities in Santa Catarina and use area codes from the latter state: Rio Negro (contiguous with Mafra) uses area code 48, and Barracão (contiguous with Dionísio Cerqueira) uses area code 49.
- Conversely, the border city of Porto União in the State of Santa Catarina is contiguous with the larger Paraná city of União da Vitória and uses the latter state's area code 42.
- The cities of Barão de Grajaú and Alto Parnaíba, in the State of Maranhão, are respectively conurbated with Floriano and Santa Filomena, in the State of Piauí, and use the latter state's area code 89 for landlines. Most local mobile phones in Alto Parnaíba, though, use Southern Maranhão area code 99. Also in Maranhão, the city of Timon, which is next to the Piauí capital city of Teresina, formerly used northern Piauí area code 86, but now it uses the Maranhão area code 99.
- Area code 61 primarily serves the Federal District (comprising the national capital city, Brasília), but it also serves some surrounding municipalities in the State of Goiás, such as Formosa, Valparaíso de Goiás and Luziânia. Formerly, area code 61 was even larger and used to include northwestern Minas Gerais (Unaí, Paracatu), now in that state's area code 38.
- Until the 1990s, the city of Paranaíba, in the state of Mato Grosso do Sul and served by Companhia Telefônica do Brasil Central (now Algar Telecom) used the code 176. Today, this city, like the others in this state, use the area code 67. Until 1997, the city of Fronteira was connected to the network of the municipality of Icém, which used the code 172, and this year the network was transferred to Companhia Telefônica do Brasil Central and started to use the area code 34.

== See also ==
- Telephone numbers in Brazil
- Carrier selection codes in Brazil
