= Jurumirim Dam =

Coordinates: 23.2103°S 49.2302°W

The Jurumirim Hydroelectric Dam (Armando Avellanal Laydner) is in the state of São Paulo, Brazil, and spans the Paranapanema River. It covers ten municipalities in the south-central area of the state, where its right bank borders the town of Cerqueira César and its left bank borders Piraju, accessed via highway SP-261.

It was owned and operated by Duke Energy until 2017, when it was bought by the Brazilian branch of the Chinese multinational company China Three Gorges Corporation (CTG).

== Characteristics ==
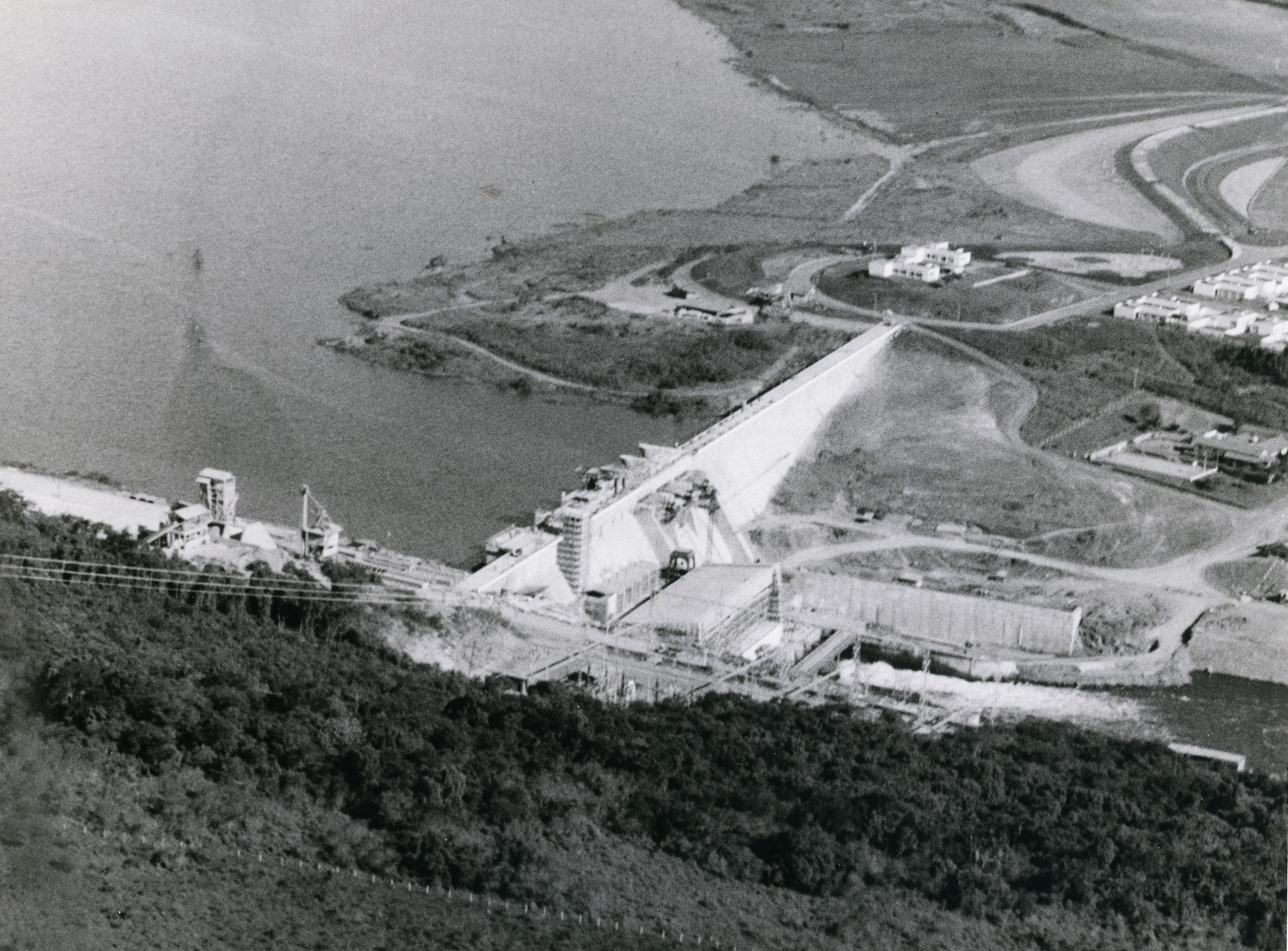
Archival image.

Construtora Servix began construction in 1956 and completed the project in 1962. The name Jurumirim comes from the Tupi language and means "little falls".

The dam can produce 98.000 kW of power, with two Kaplan-type turbines, with a height difference of 30.9 m. Its reservoir inundates an area of about 449 km².

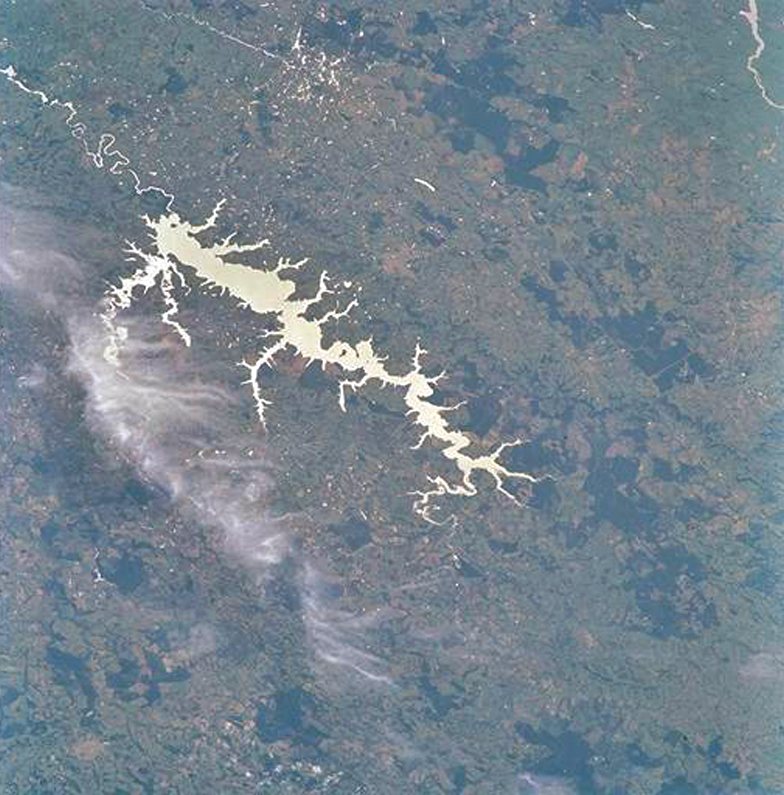
Satellite image (NASA)

According to the National Electric System Operator (ONS), the lake at the Jurumirim Hydroelectric Plant is capable of storing 2% of the volume that can be dammed by the reservoirs of the Southeast/Central West System, which represents 34.42% of the water storage of the Paranapanema river.

The river basin has an area of 17,800 km². It is about 100 km long and in some stretches exceeds three km in width. The dam has an area of 449 km², containing a volume of water almost four times greater than that of Guanabara Bay in Rio de Janeiro, with a discharge of 1,790 m³/s.449 km².

The generation of electrical energy is the primary purpose of the dam, but it also serves to accumulate water to provide to other plants on the Paranapanema, including, in the direction of the Paraná River: Chavantes, Salto Grande, Canoas II, Canoas I, Capivara, Taquaruçu e Rosana. All of these plants are managed by CTG Brasil.

== Flooded municipalities ==
- Piraju
- Cerqueira César
- Arandu
- Avaré
- Itaí
- Taquarituba
- Tejupá
- Itatinga
- Paranapanema
- Angatuba

== Photo gallery ==
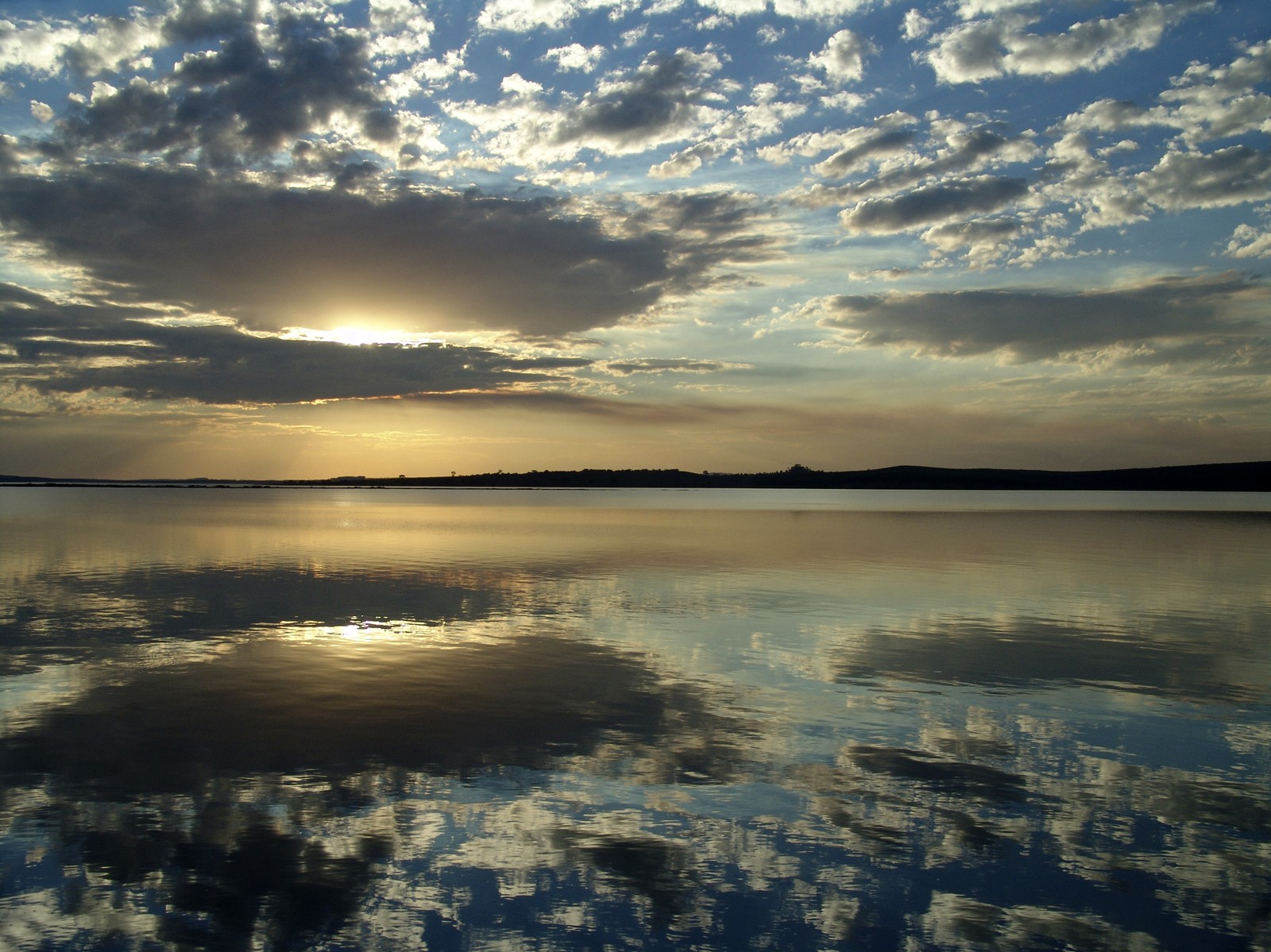
Dam in Paranapanema

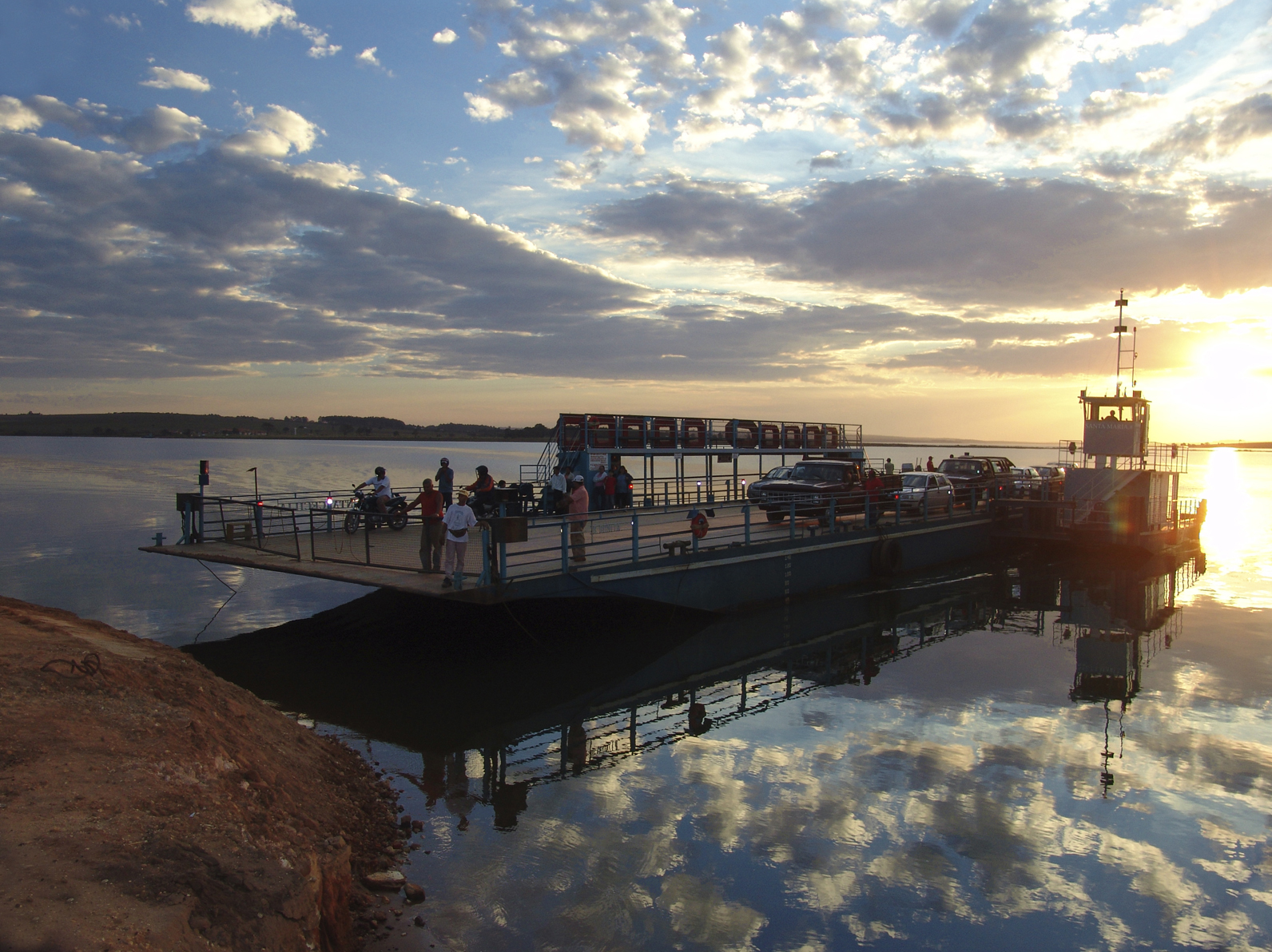
Ferry between Itatinga and Paranapanema

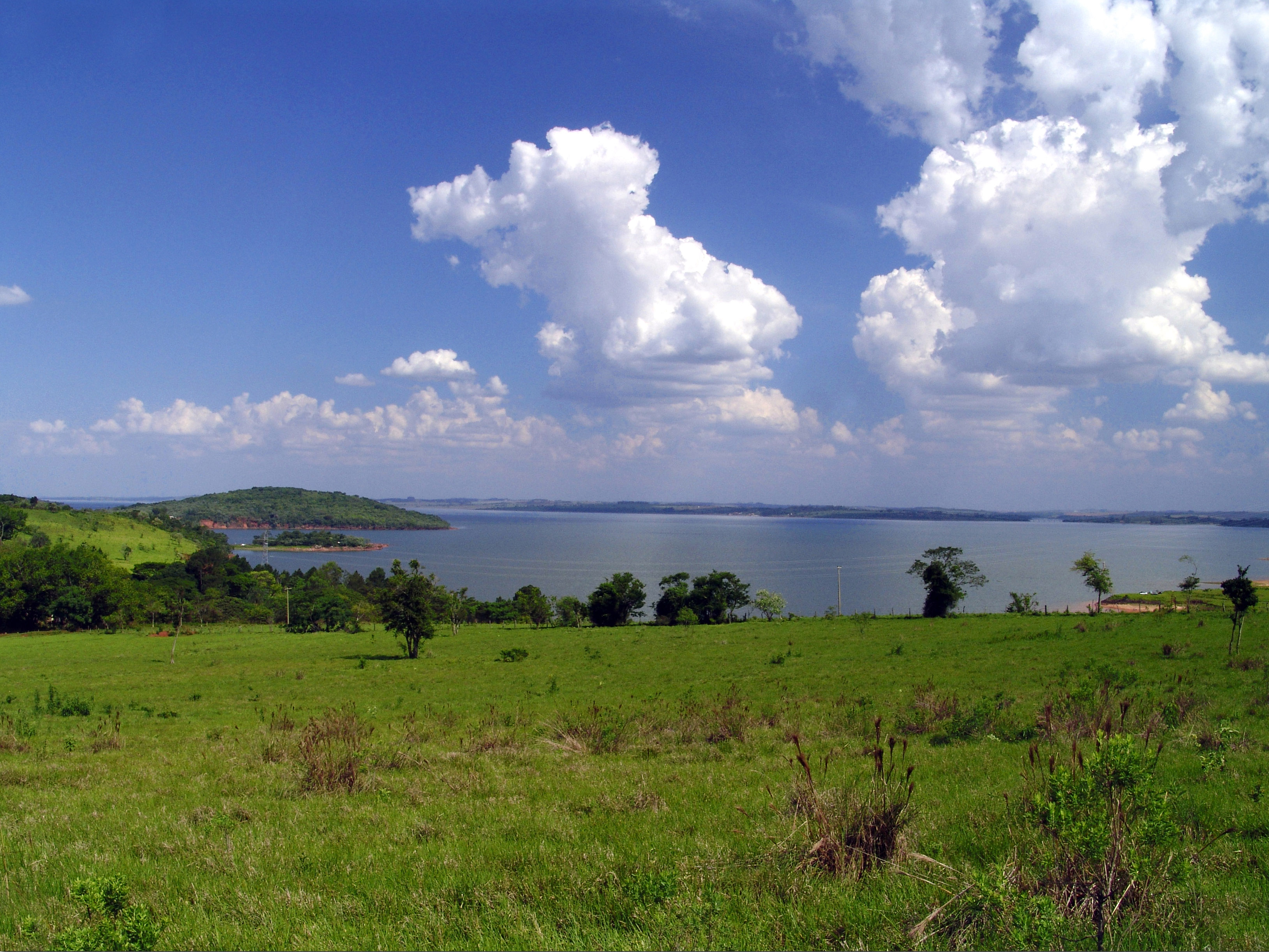
View of the reservoir near the dam - Piraju

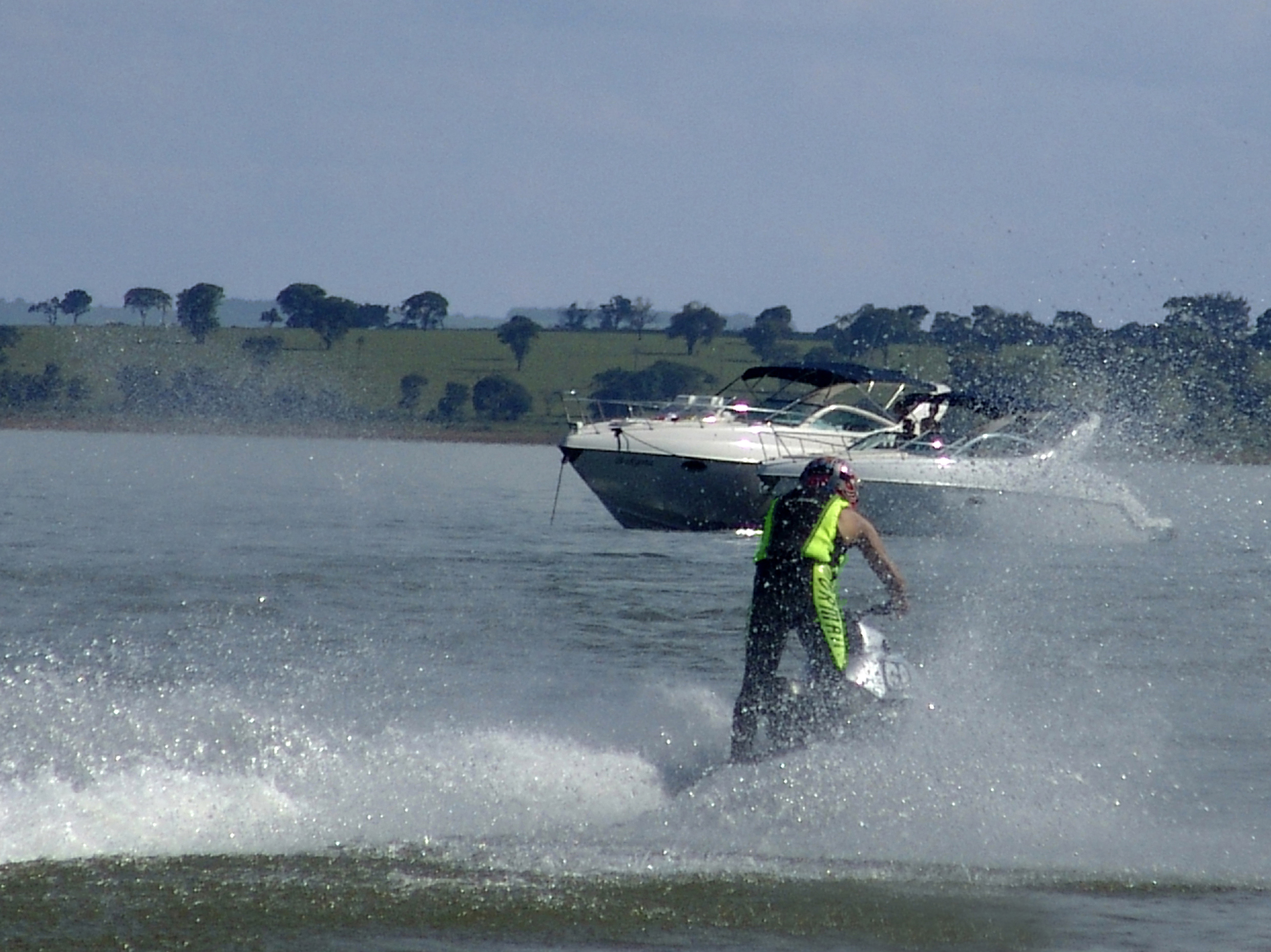
Jet Ski championship near Avaré campsite, 2005

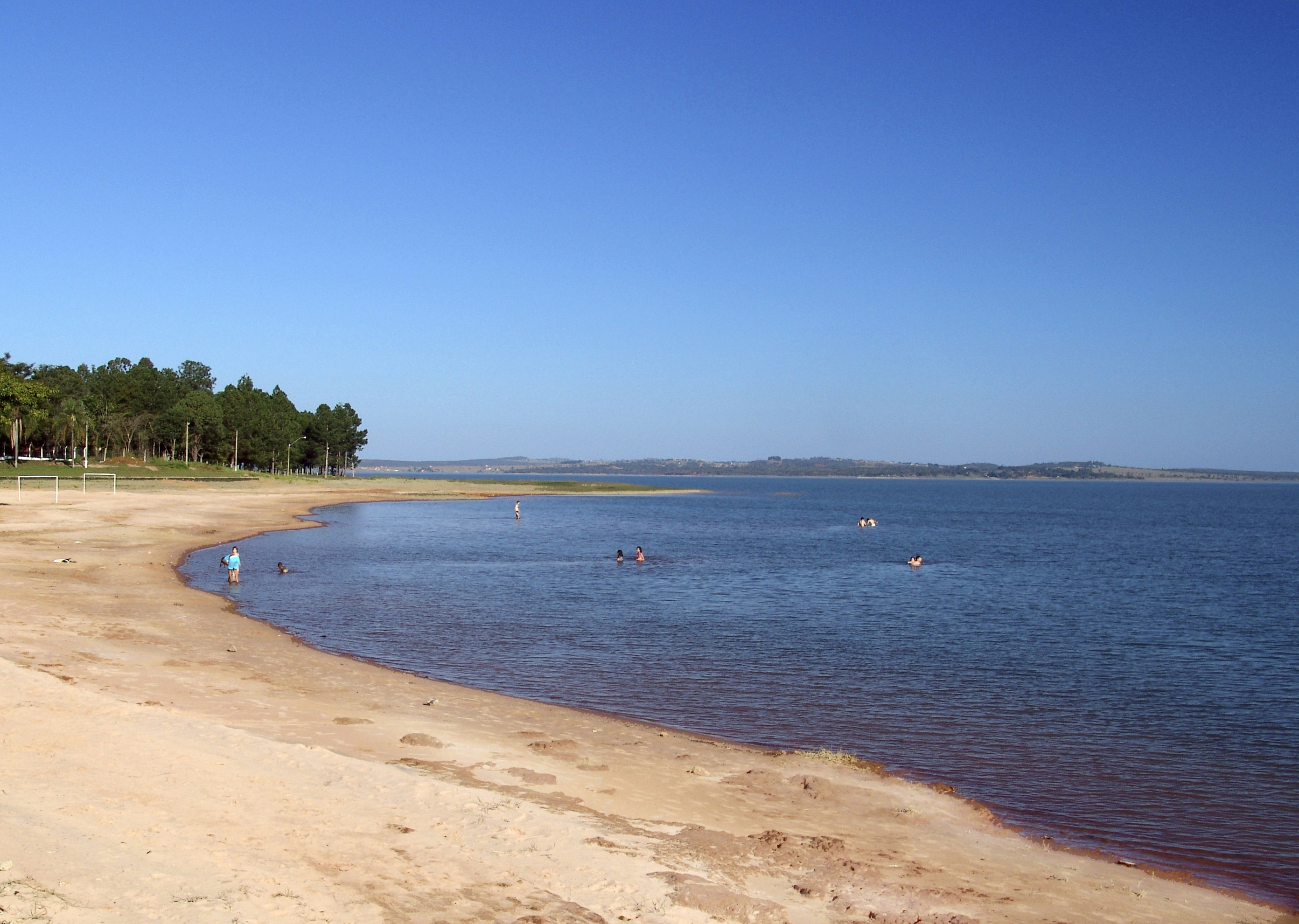
Beach at the city campground near Avaré

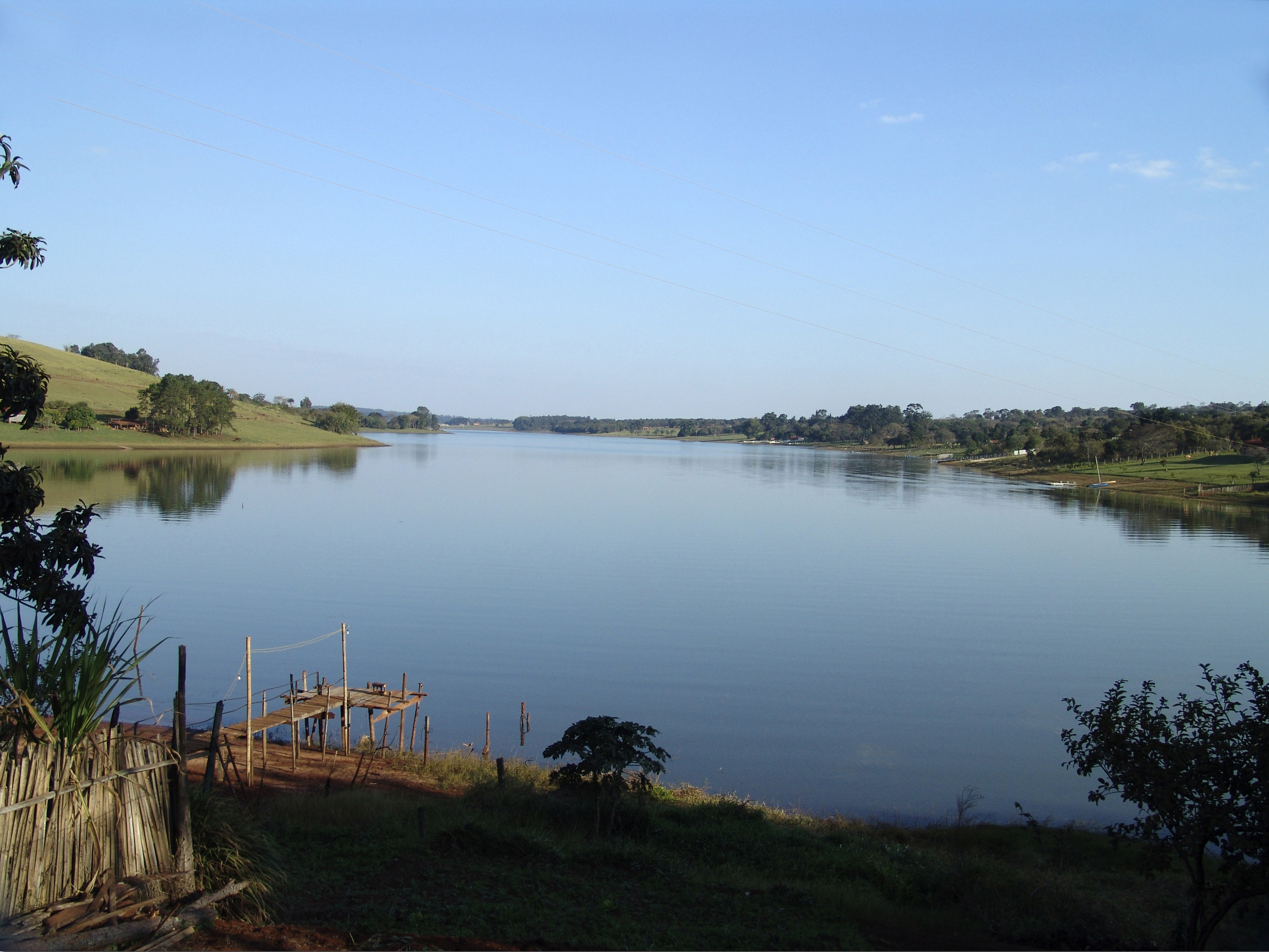
Section of the dam in the Anhumas neighborhood in Arandu

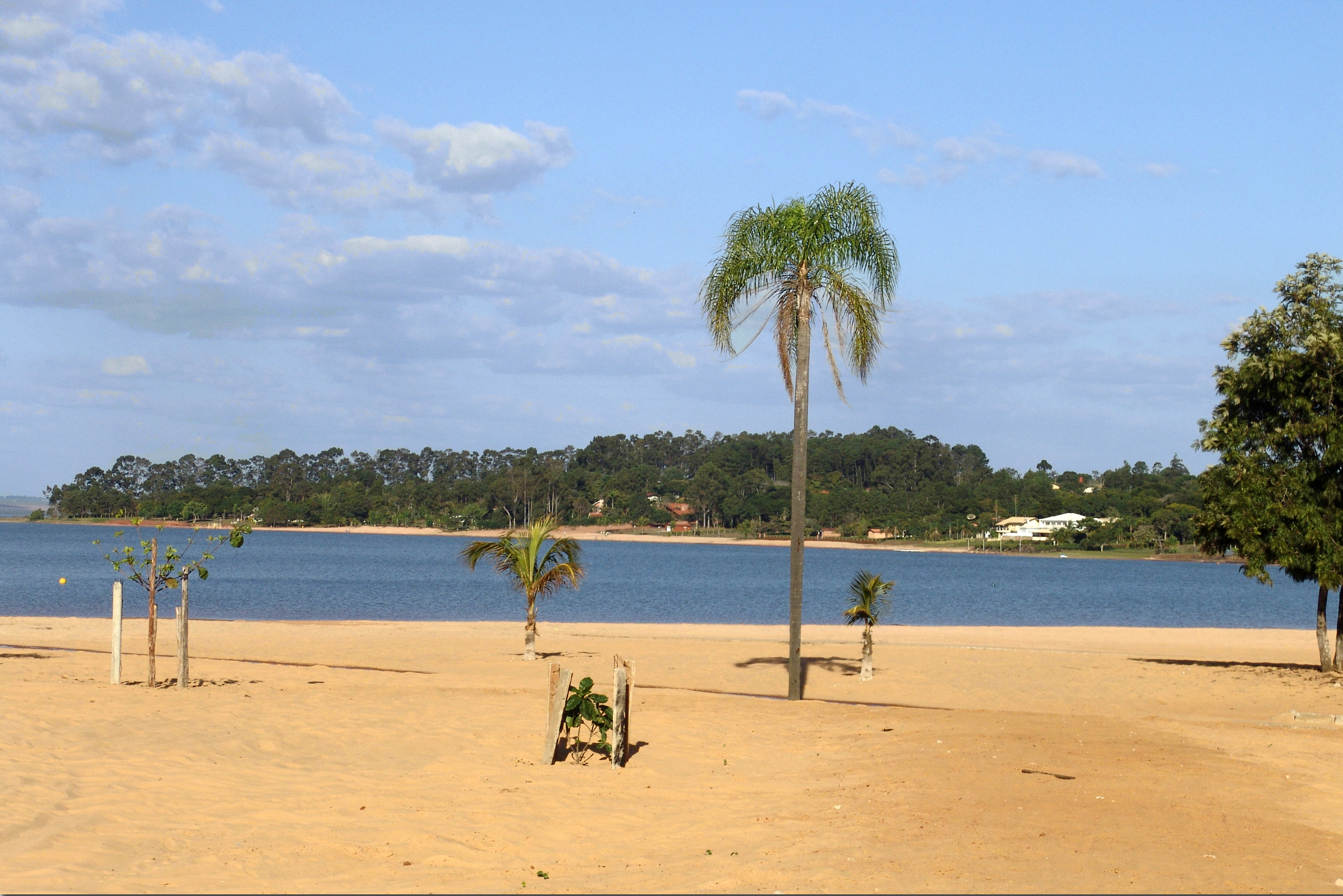
City beach on the reservoir in Itaí

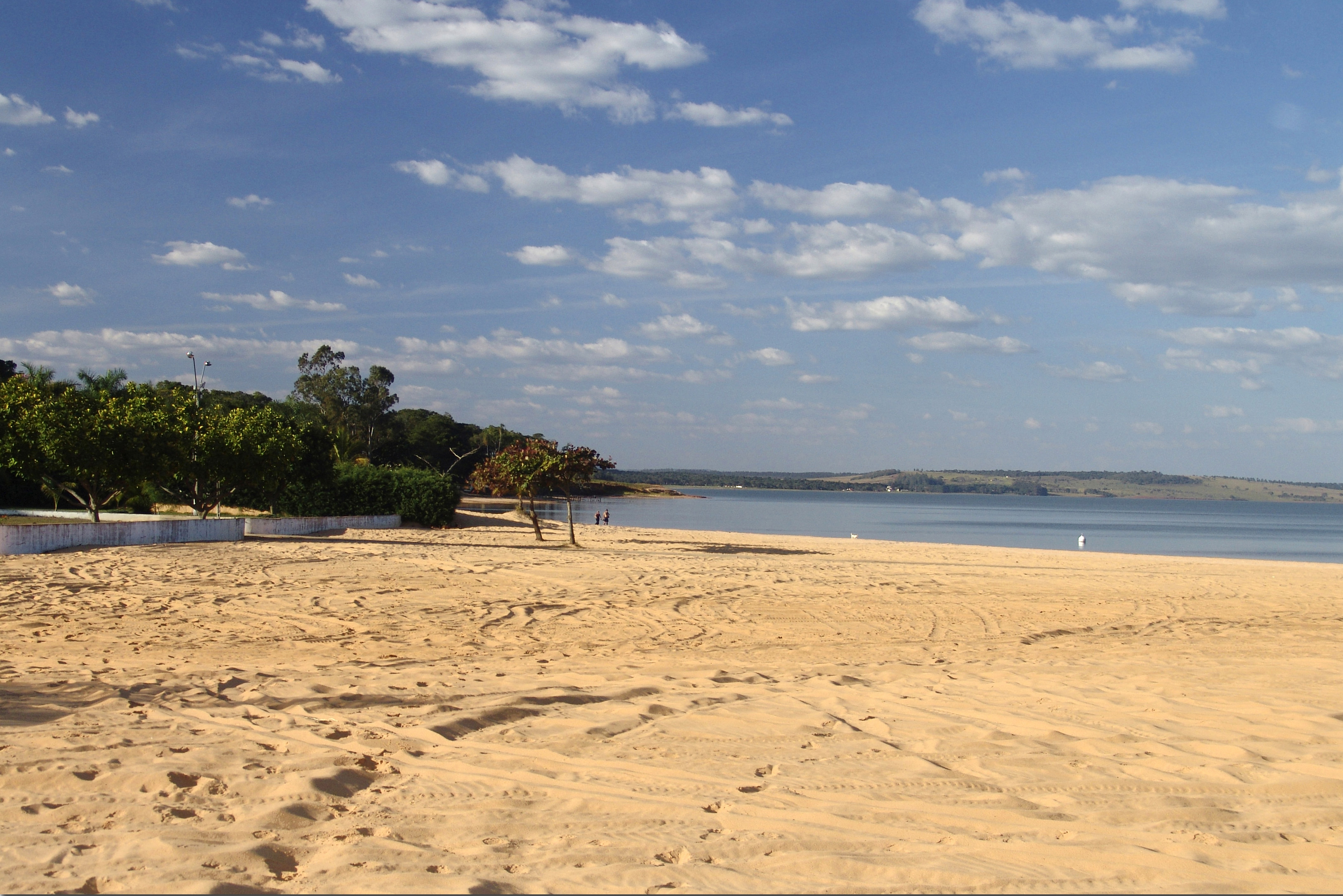
Beach near Itaí from another side Avaré

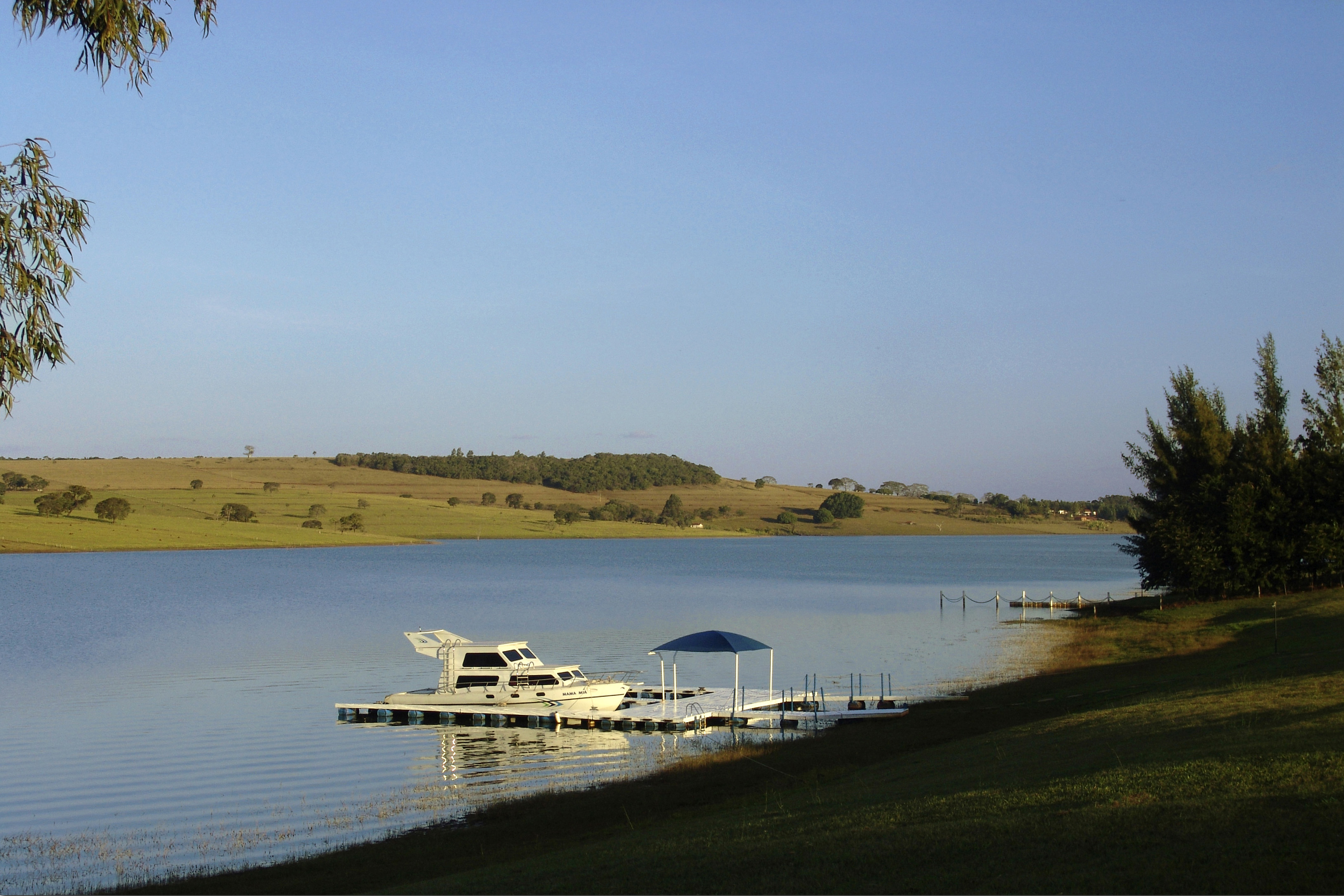
One of the arms of the dam - hotel anchorage

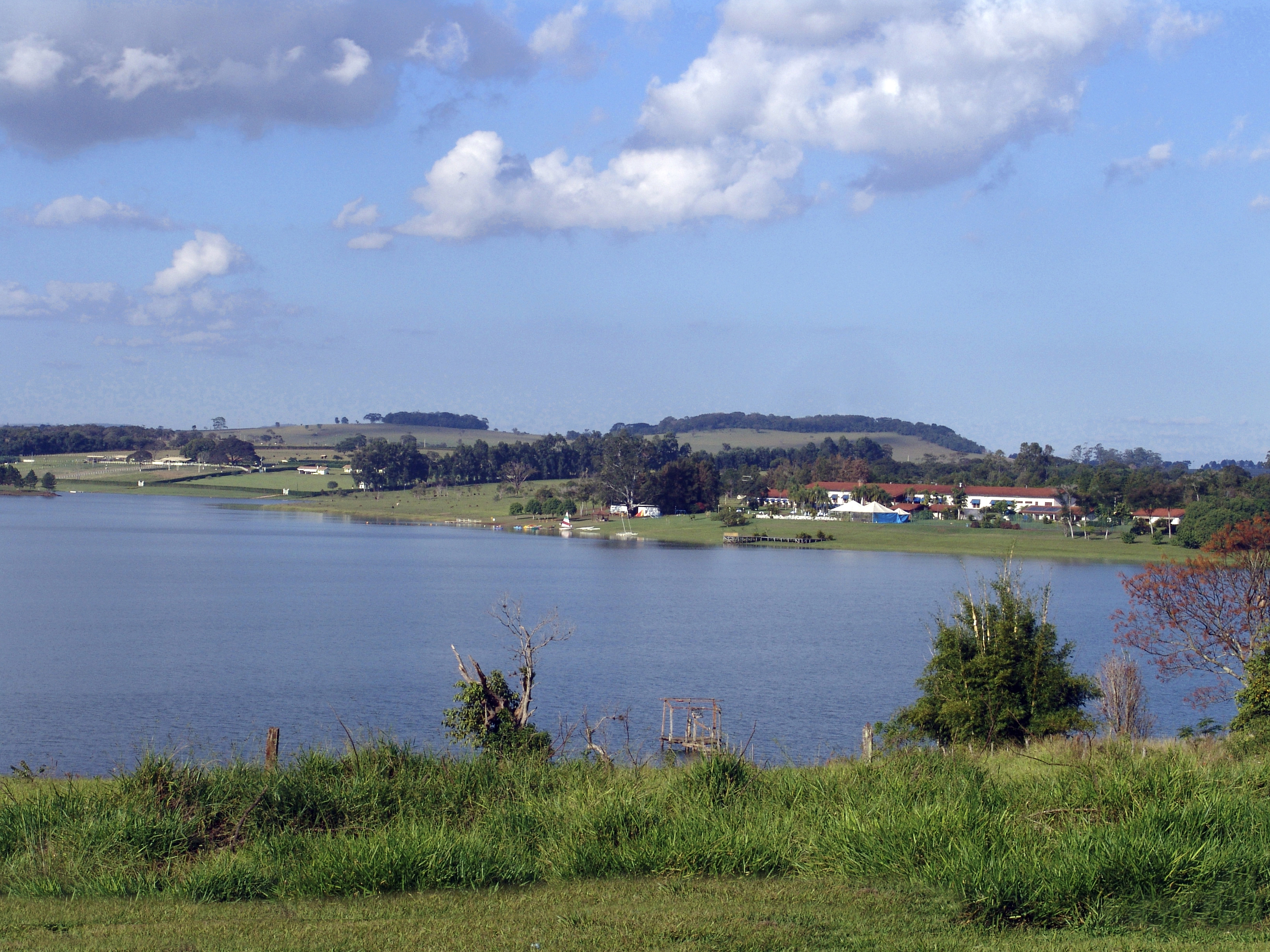
View of hotels on the banks of Avaré, São Paulo

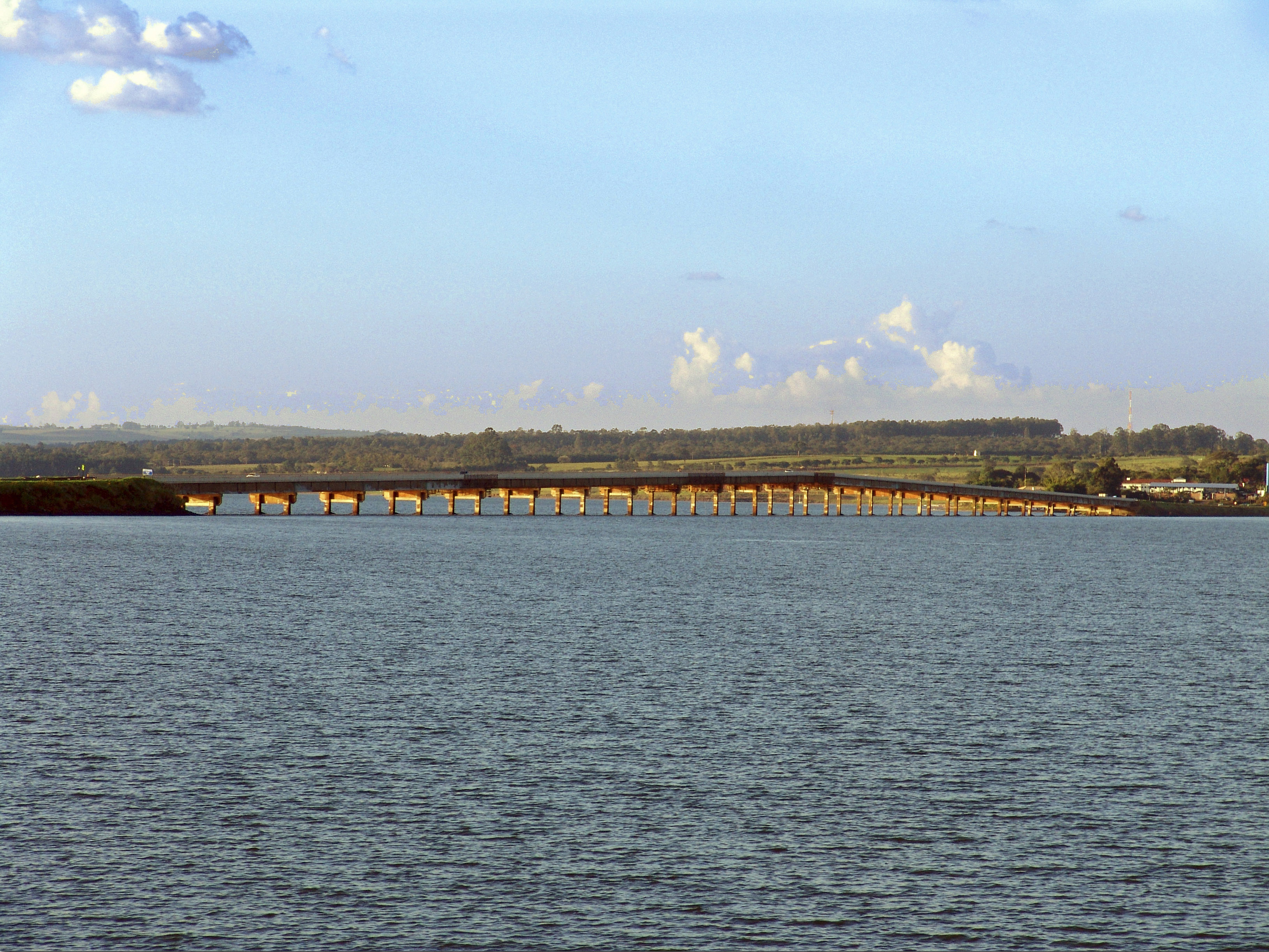
Ponte Carvalho Pinto on route SP-255 - Avaré/Itaí

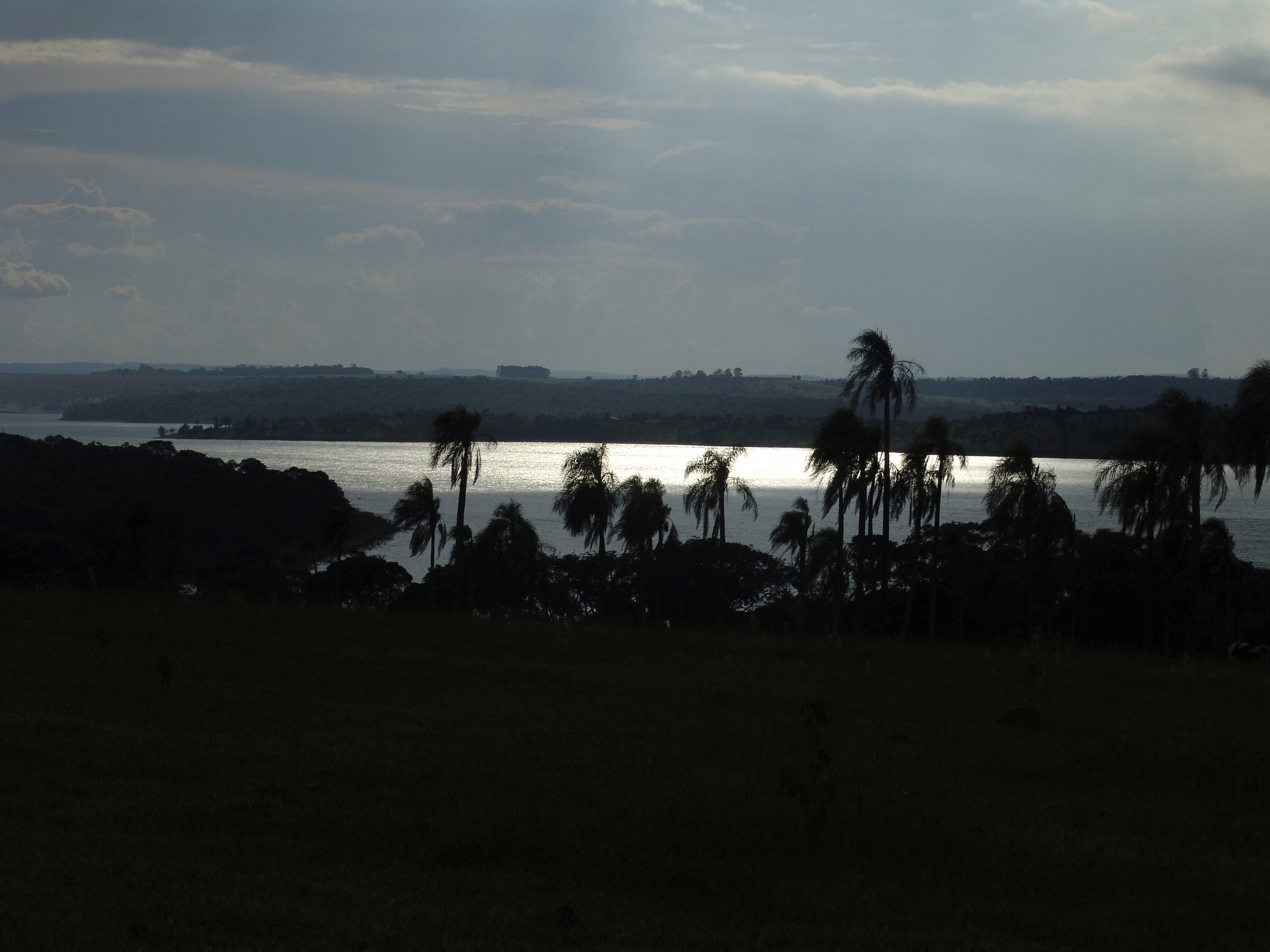
Twilight view along SP-255 - Avaré

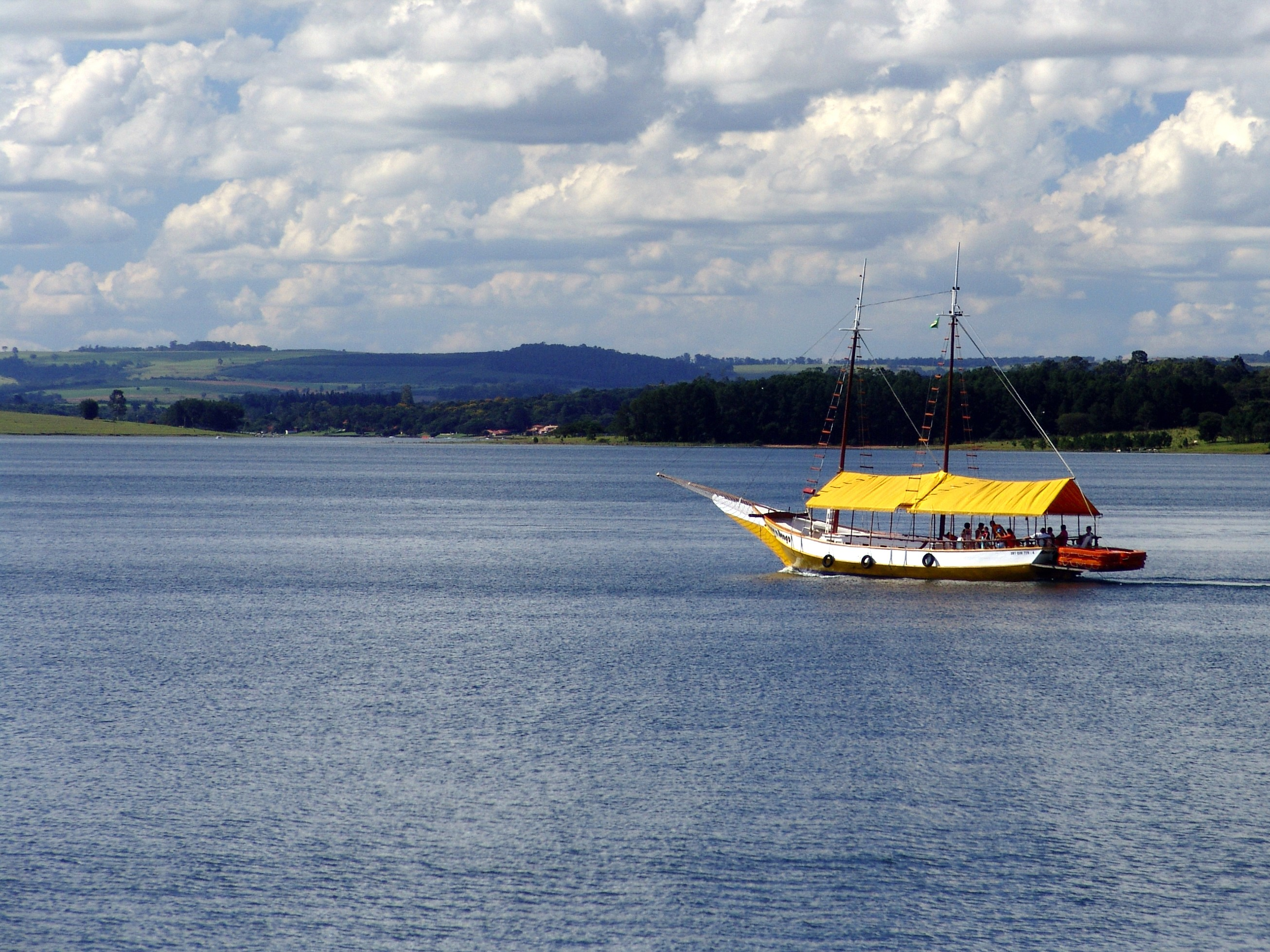
View above Ponte Carvalho Pinto - SP-255 - Avaré

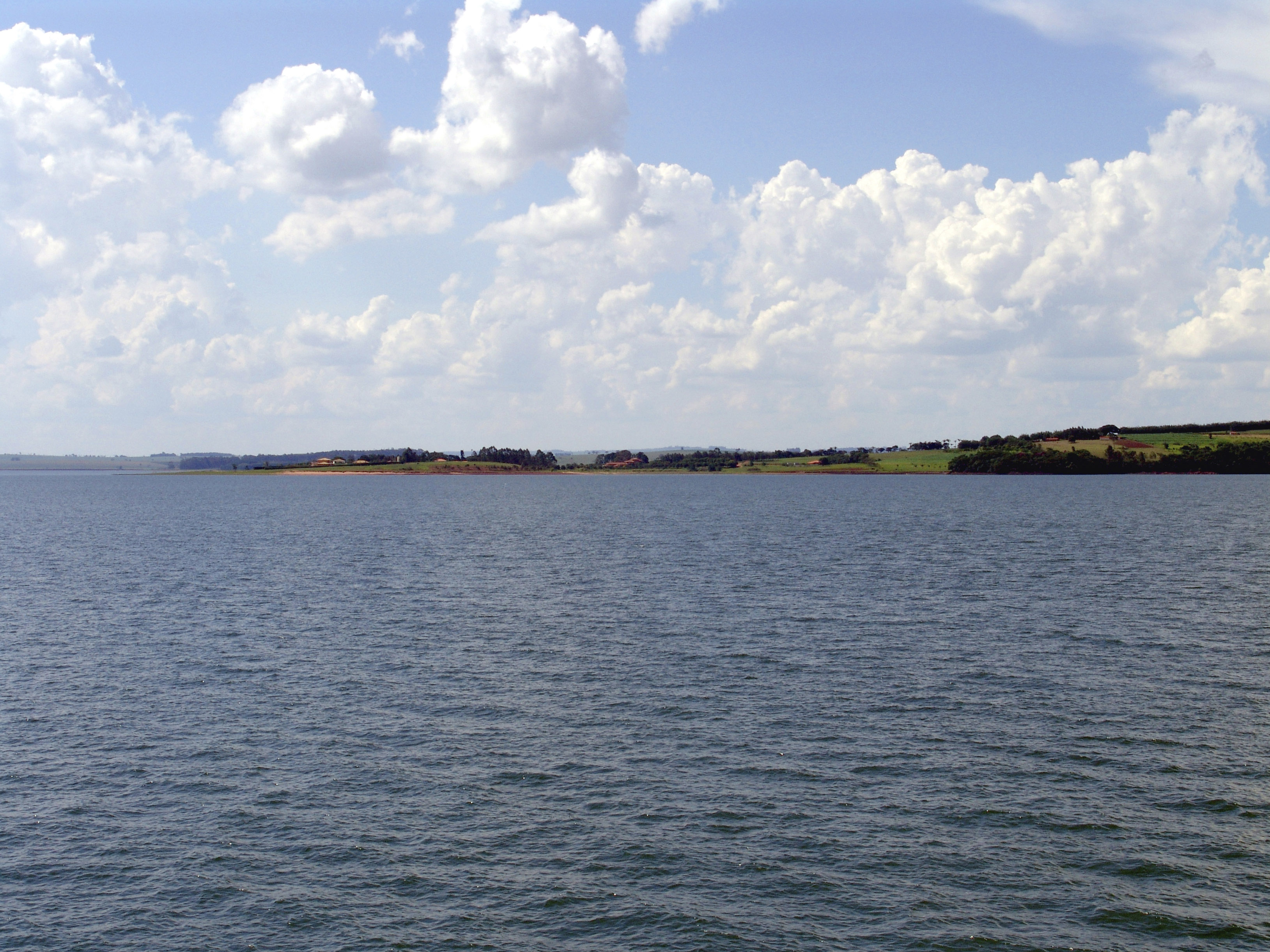
View from above Ponte Carvalho Pinto - SP-255 - Avaré

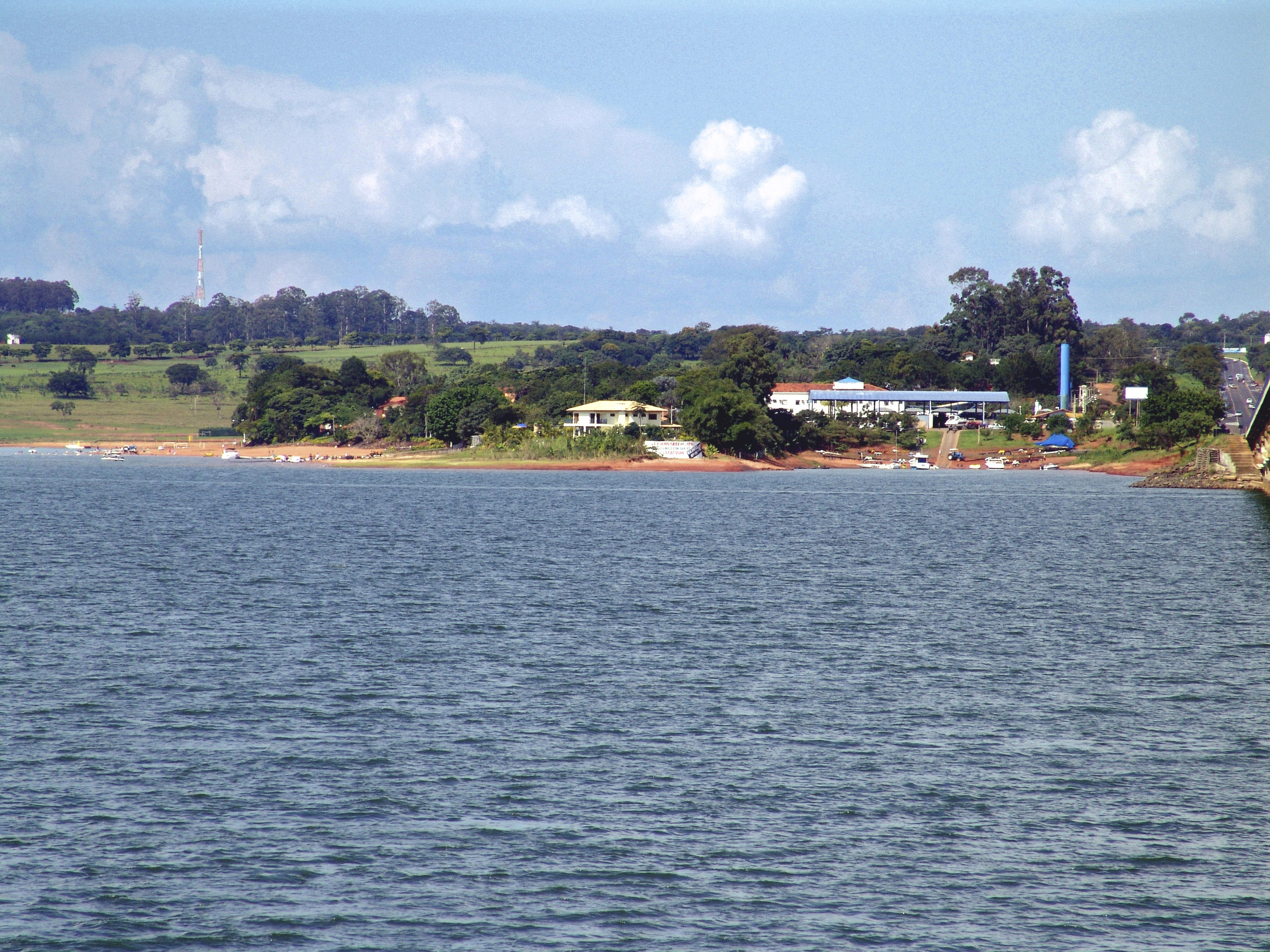
Summer houses on the coast along Avaré

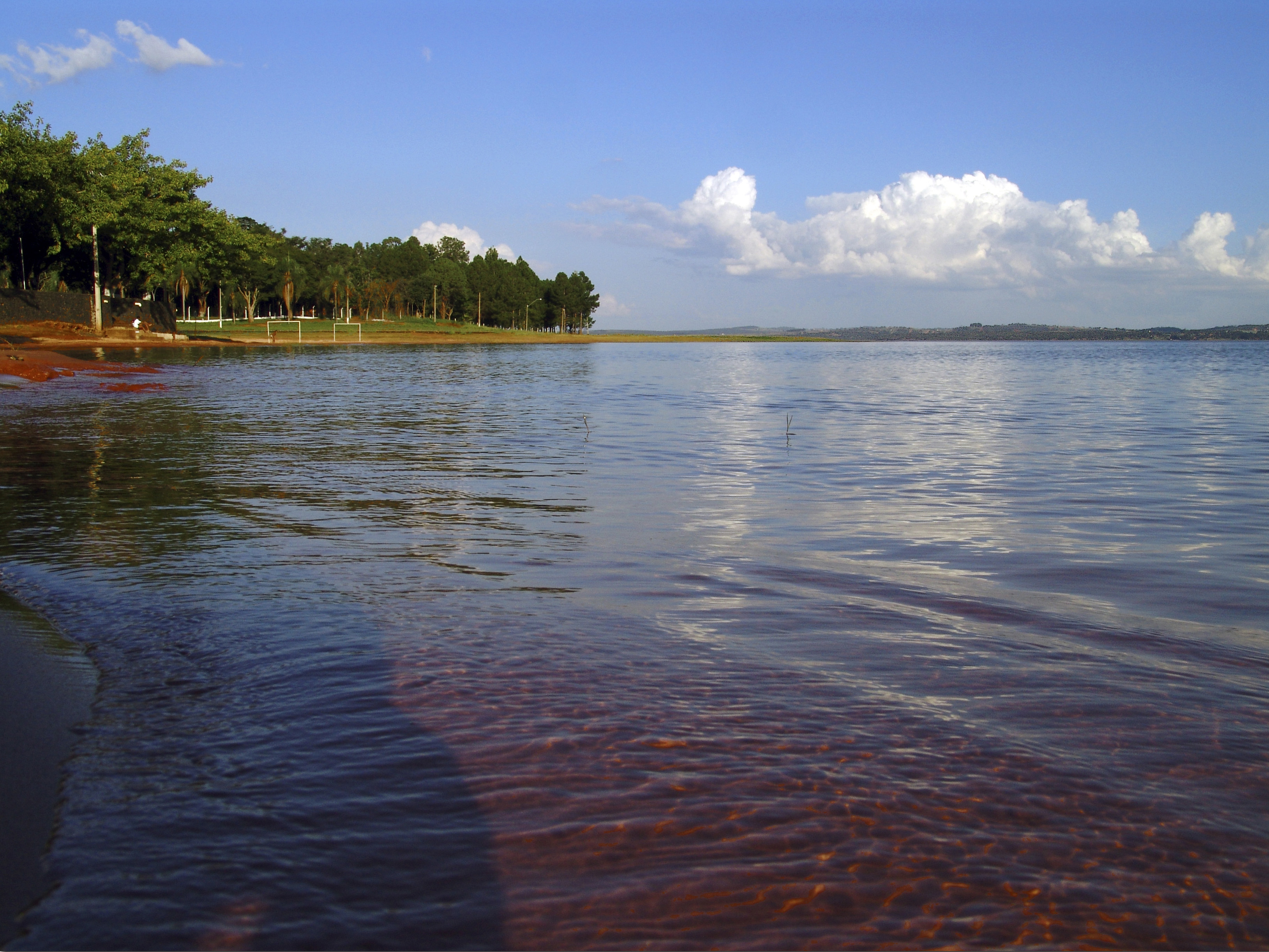
Beach in Avaré campsite

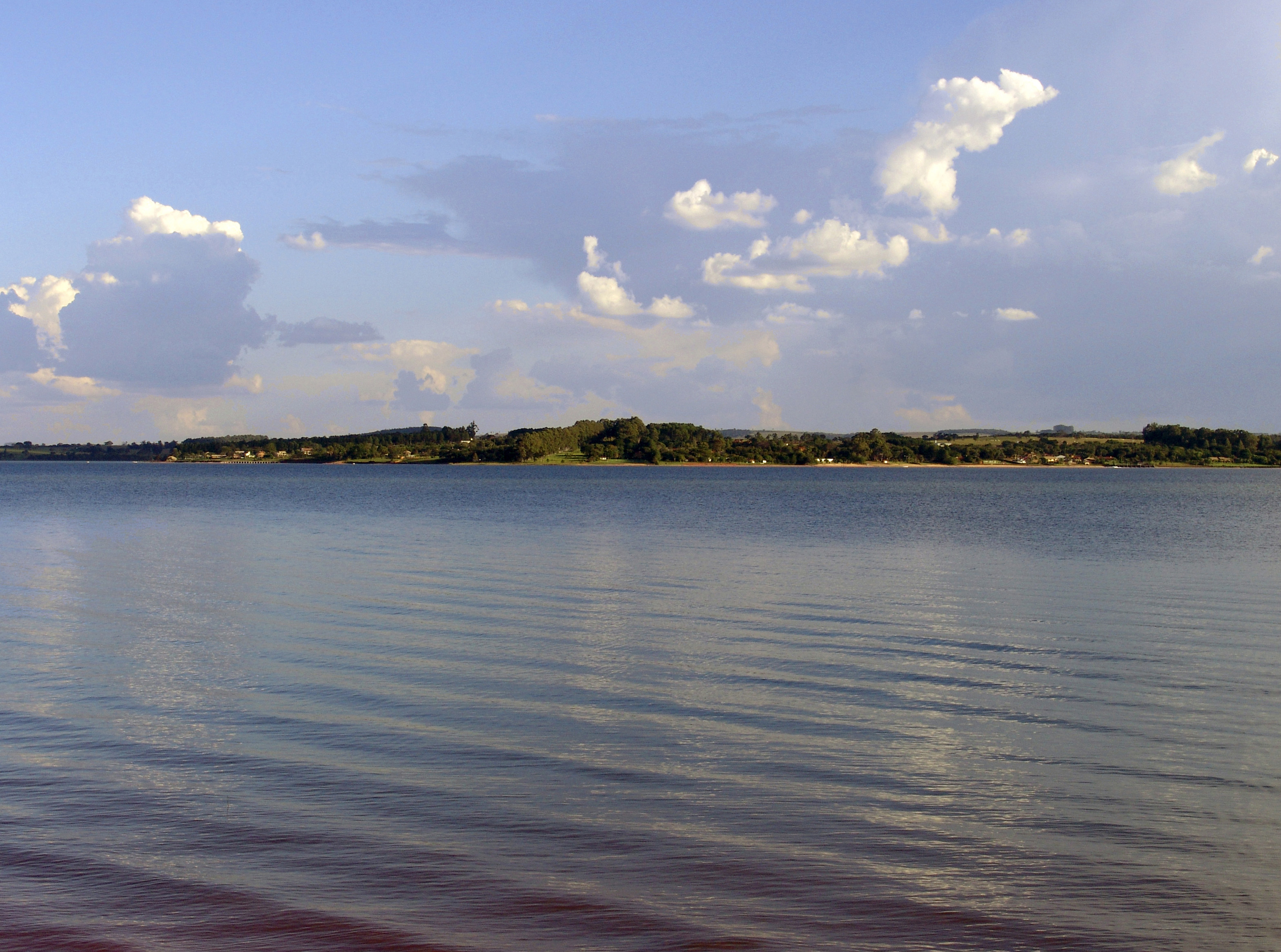
The reservoir seen from Avaré campground

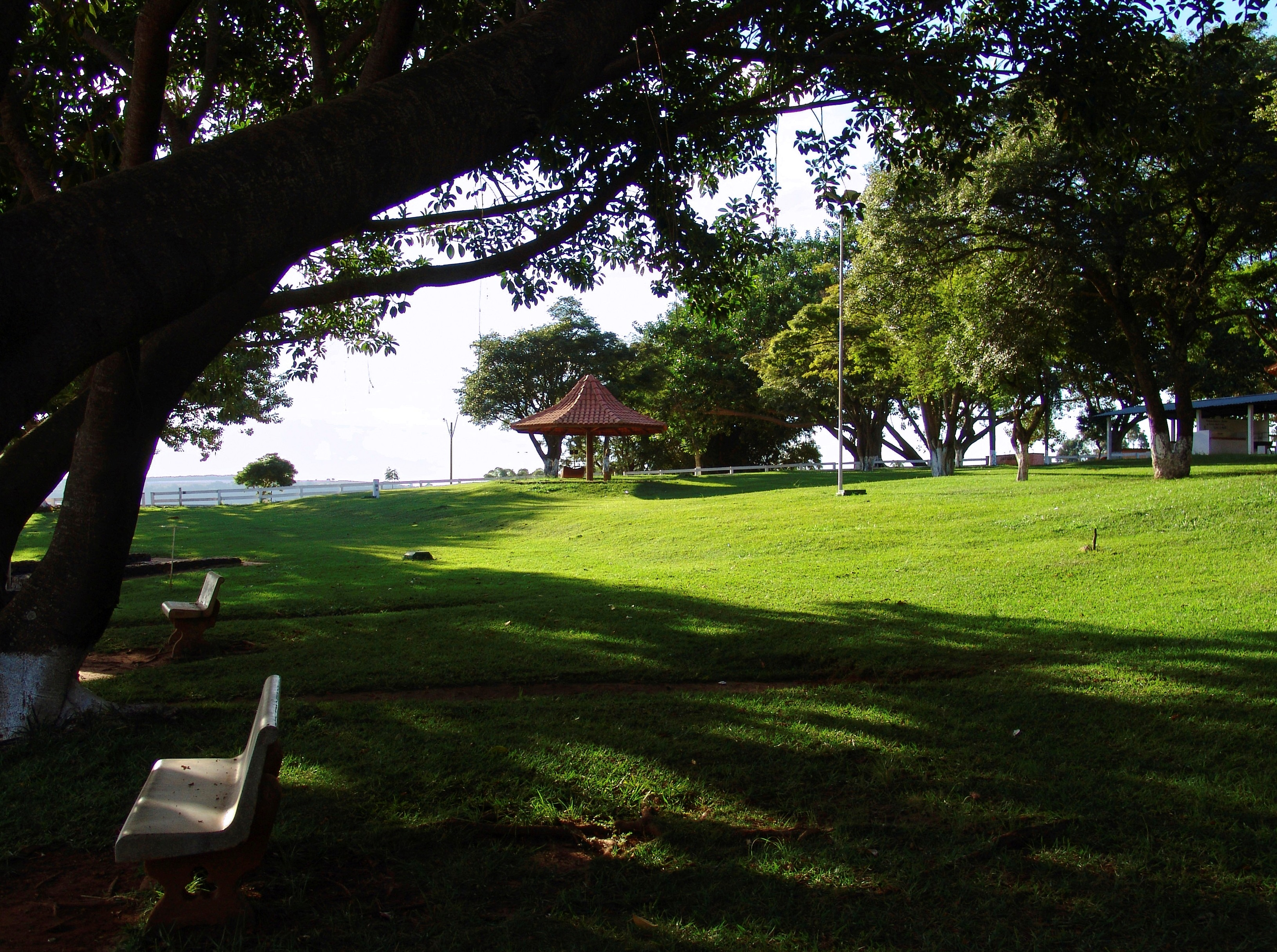
Partial view of the campground in Avaré

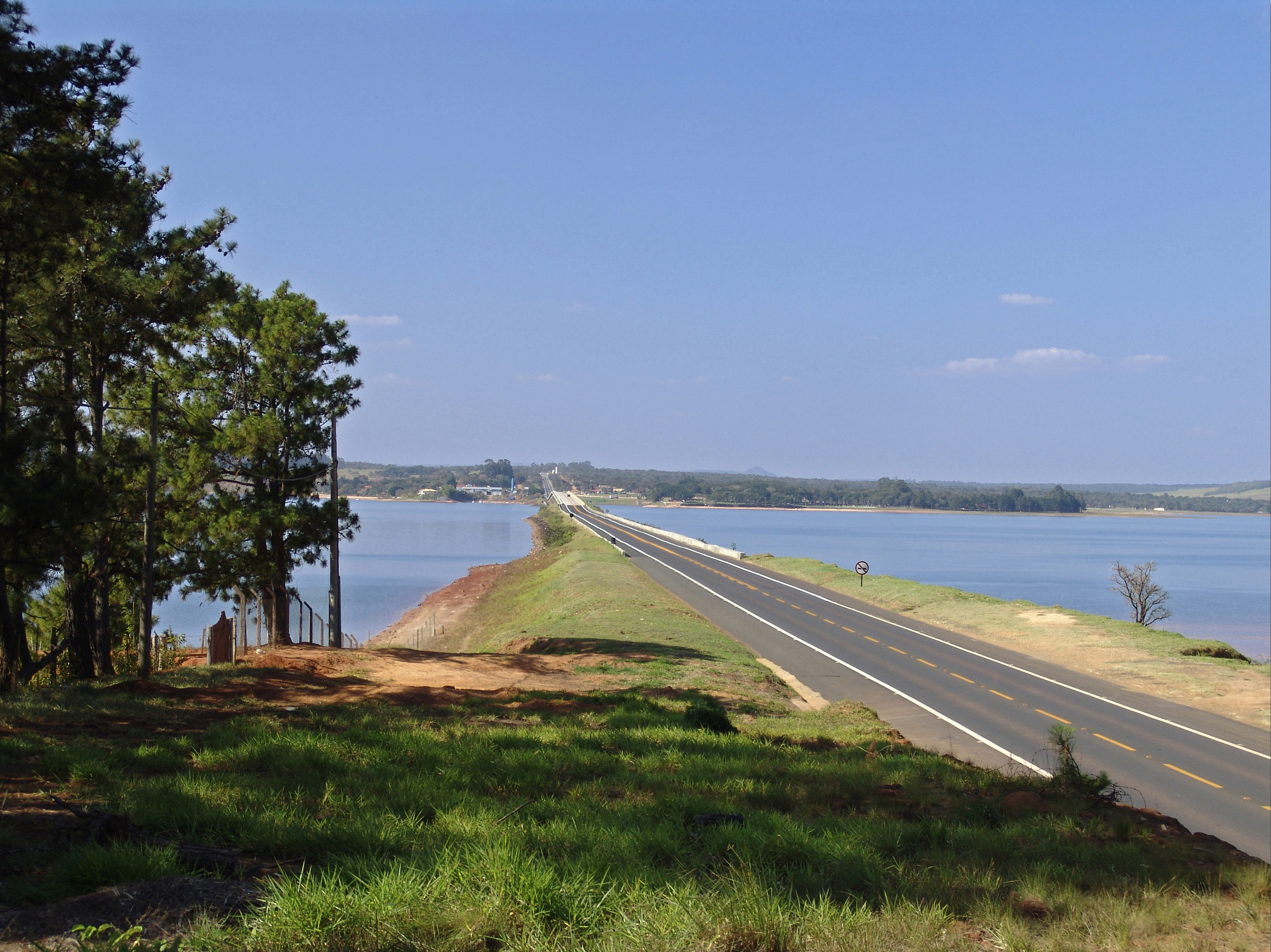
Carvalho Pinto bridge on the reservoir, from Itaí to Avaré

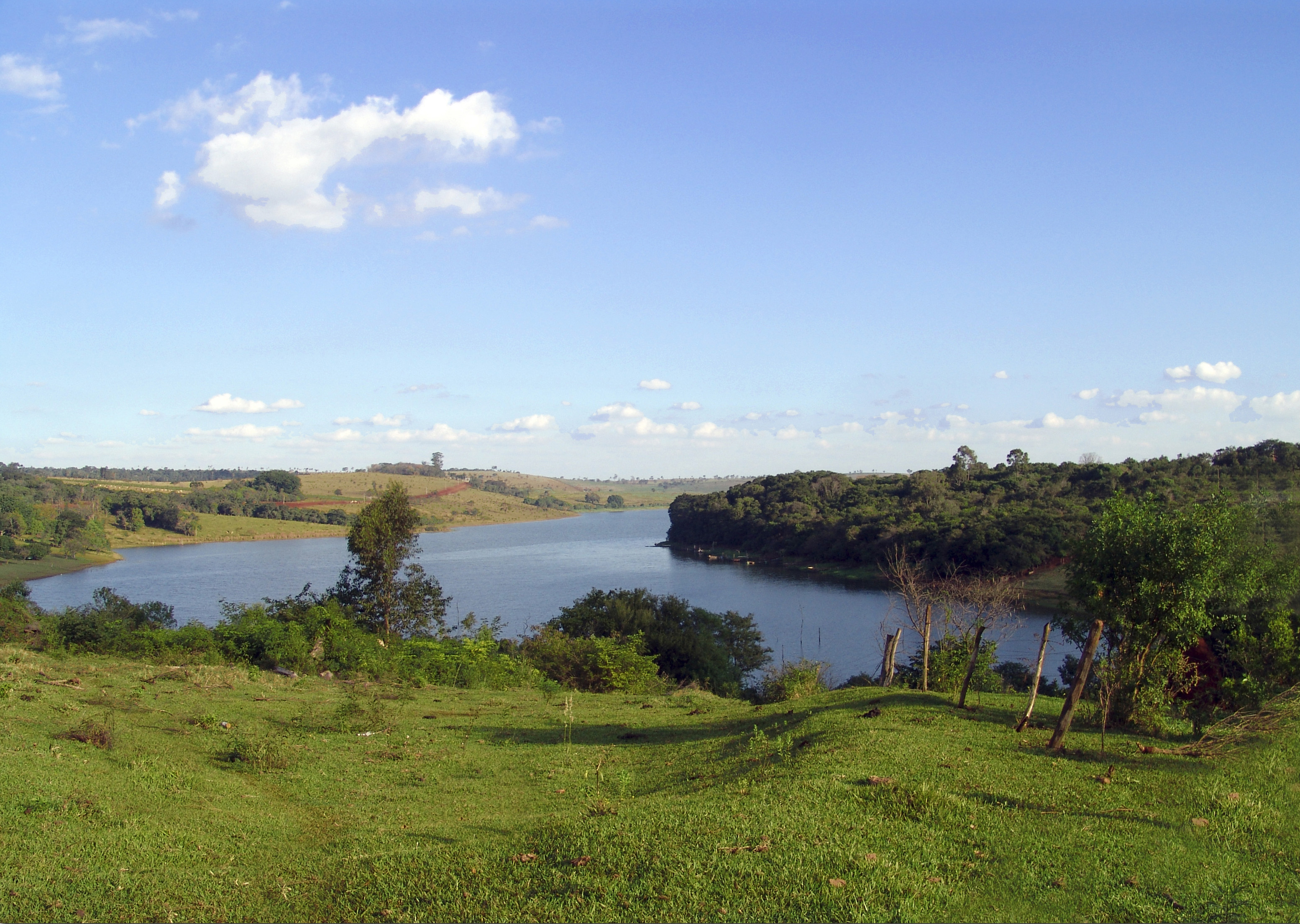
A branch of the reservoir in Arandu - coming from Anízio
