= Avaré, São Paulo =

Municipality in the state of São Paulo in Brazil

Avaré
- Municipality
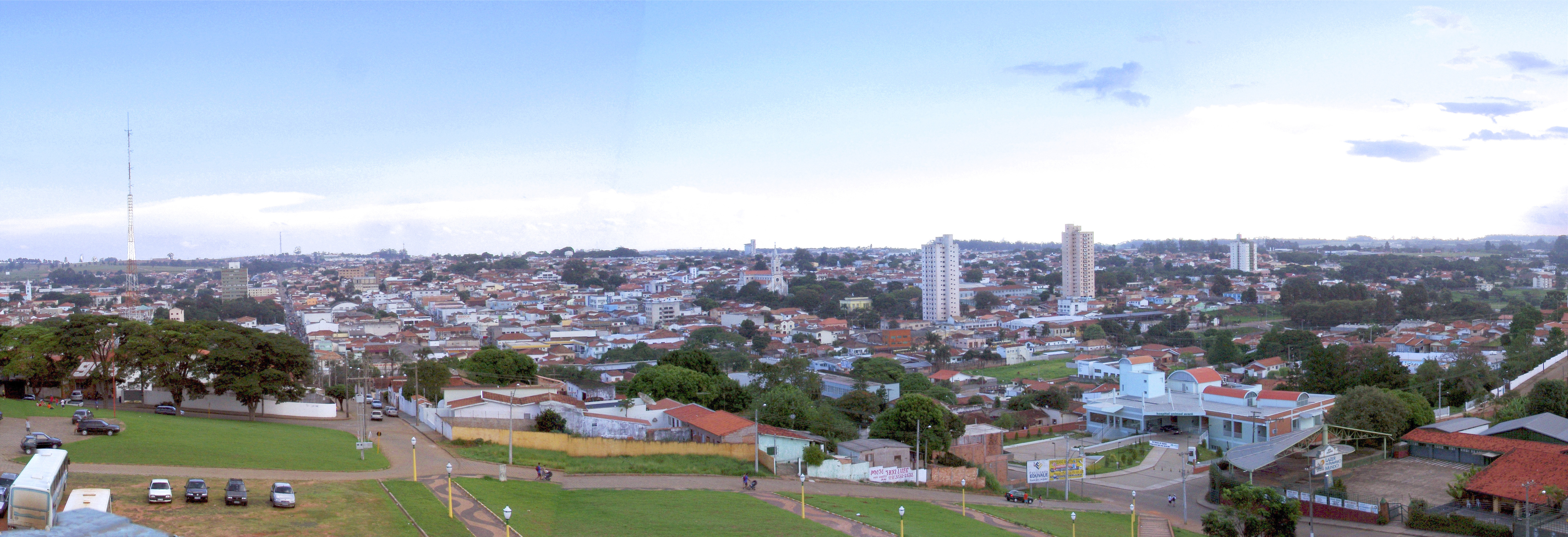

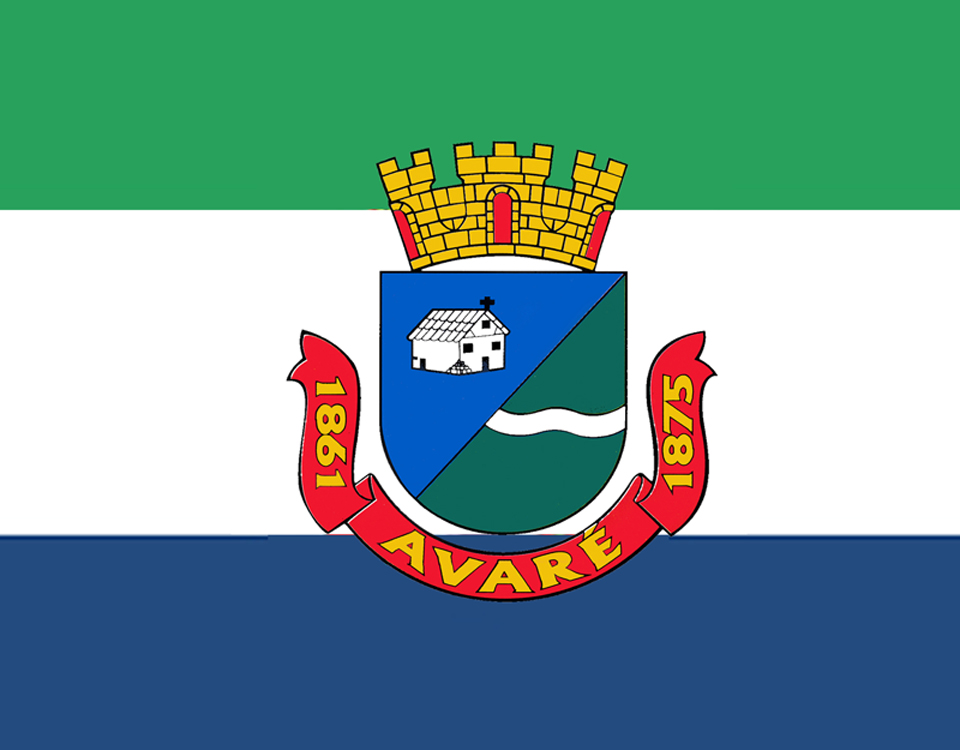
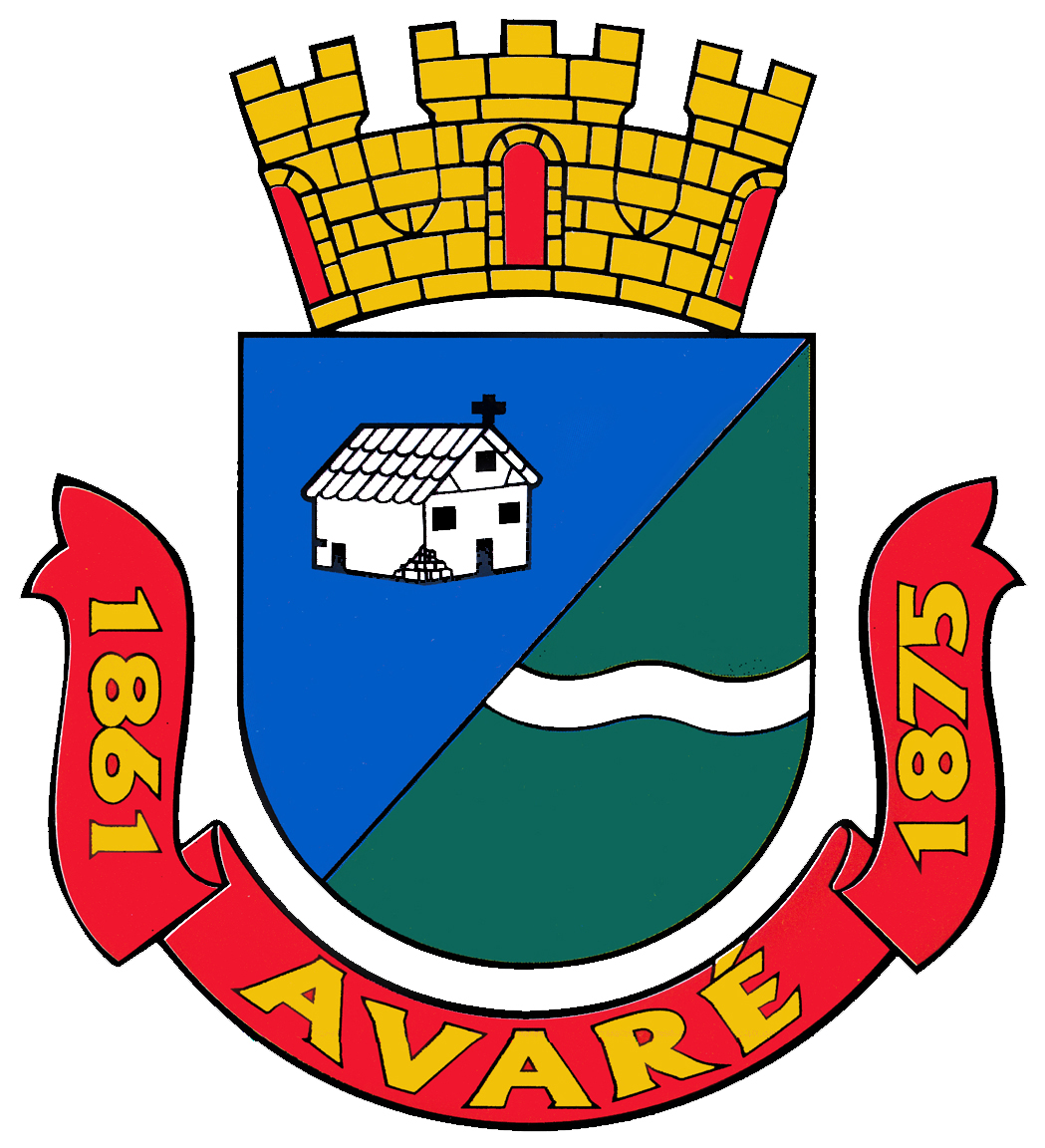
- Flag Coat of arms

- Location in São Paulo state

- Location in Brazil
- Coordinates: 23°05′56″S 48°55′33″W
- Country: Brazil
- Region: Southeast
- State: São Paulo

Government
  - Mayor: Roberto de Araujo (2025-2028) (Partido Liberal (PL))

Area
  - Total: 1,213.055 km^{2} (468.363 sq mi)
- Elevation: 766 m (2,513 ft)

Population (2022)
  - Total: 92,805
  - Density: 76.51/km^{2} (198.2/sq mi)
- Time zone: UTC−3 (BRT)
- Area code: 14
- HDI: 0.767 (2010)
- Per capita income: R$ 47,503.24 (2023)
- Website: www.avare.sp.gov.br

Avaré is a city in the State of São Paulo, Brazil, located 270 km from the state capital, São Paulo. The population is 92,805 (2022 est.) in an area of 1,213 km^{2}. Established on 15 September 1861 by Major Vitoriano de Souza Rocha and Domiciano Santana, the city was developed around the chapel of Our Lady of the Good Death ("Nossa Senhora da Boa Morte").

The economy is based on agriculture, cattle ranching and tourism. The Jurumirim Hydroelectric Dam in the Paranapanema River is situated near Avaré. The city has its own airport, Avaré-Arandu Airport.

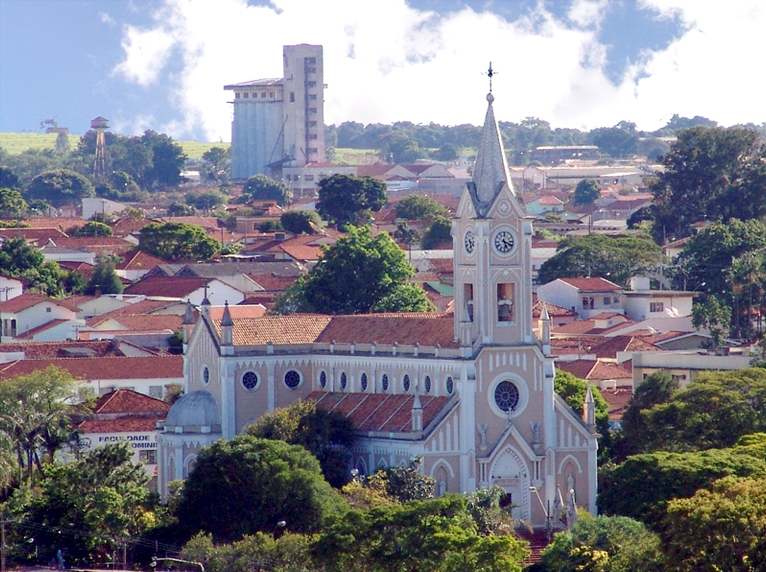
Shrine Our Lady of the Pains of Avaré

Tourism is an important aspect in Avaré, which today is virtually a large ranch. Traditional events occur throughout the year, such as the Feira das Nações (Fair of the Nations), where typical foods of various countries are served, and the FAMPOP, (Fair of Popular Music), whose objective is to highlight and award singers, musicians and composers. Natural attractions such as Terra da Água, do Verde e do Sol ("Land of water, the green, and the sun") also invite tourists to the beauty of Avaré's large reservoir.

The city is also distinguished as a center of higher education. Many students from the surrounding region come to Avaré seeking a quality education and a chance to study. The Faculdade Sudoeste Paulista (São Paulo State Southwest College) and other higher education institutions are located there.

== Demography ==
=== Demographics ===
Historical population (municipality)
Year	Population	%±
1920	23,221
1940	28,628	23.3%
1950	27,478	−4.0%
1960	36,689	33.5%
1970	37,854	3.2%
1980	46,921	24.0%
1991	61,101	30.2%
2000	76,472	25.2%
2010	82,934	8.5%
2022	92,805	11.9%

== Media ==
In telecommunications, the city was served by Companhia Telefônica Brasileira until 1973, when it began to be served by Telecomunicações de São Paulo. In July 1998, this company was acquired by Telefónica, which adopted the Vivo brand in 2012.

The company is currently an operator of cell phones, fixed lines, internet (fiber optics/4G) and television (satellite and cable).

== Geography ==
=== Climate ===
The weather is pleasant throughout the year, however summers can sometimes be hot and humid.

Climate data for Avaré, São Paulo, elevation 776 m (2,546 ft), (1981–2010 normals, extremes 1931–1960, 1968–present)
Month	Jan	Feb	Mar	Apr	May	Jun	Jul	Aug	Sep	Oct	Nov	Dec	Year
Record high °C (°F)	39.4 (102.9)	38.4 (101.1)	37.4 (99.3)	35.2 (95.4)	36.1 (97.0)	35.0 (95.0)	34.4 (93.9)	36.8 (98.2)	36.4 (97.5)	40.5 (104.9)	37.8 (100.0)	39.6 (103.3)	40.5 (104.9)
Mean daily maximum °C (°F)	28.3 (82.9)	29.1 (84.4)	28.8 (83.8)	27.4 (81.3)	24.0 (75.2)	23.4 (74.1)	23.5 (74.3)	25.5 (77.9)	26.4 (79.5)	27.8 (82.0)	28.4 (83.1)	28.5 (83.3)	26.8 (80.2)
Daily mean °C (°F)	22.7 (72.9)	23.1 (73.6)	22.8 (73.0)	21.3 (70.3)	18.1 (64.6)	17.8 (64.0)	16.8 (62.2)	18.5 (65.3)	19.0 (66.2)	20.9 (69.6)	21.5 (70.7)	22.3 (72.1)	20.4 (68.7)
Mean daily minimum °C (°F)	18.8 (65.8)	18.9 (66.0)	18.3 (64.9)	16.9 (62.4)	14.1 (57.4)	13.1 (55.6)	12.8 (55.0)	13.6 (56.5)	14.4 (57.9)	15.7 (60.3)	16.5 (61.7)	17.9 (64.2)	15.9 (60.6)
Record low °C (°F)	11.9 (53.4)	10.4 (50.7)	10.5 (50.9)	4.6 (40.3)	1.2 (34.2)	−2.0 (28.4)	−2.0 (28.4)	0.4 (32.7)	3.3 (37.9)	7.5 (45.5)	9.3 (48.7)	11.6 (52.9)	−2.0 (28.4)
Average precipitation mm (inches)	287.5 (11.32)	182.6 (7.19)	159.5 (6.28)	105.6 (4.16)	94.4 (3.72)	62.5 (2.46)	56.9 (2.24)	48.4 (1.91)	96.5 (3.80)	143.1 (5.63)	131.3 (5.17)	210.5 (8.29)	1,578.8 (62.16)
Average precipitation days (≥ 1.0 mm)	16	13	11	7	7	5	4	4	7	9	9	13	105
Source: Instituto Nacional de Meteorologia

== Gallery ==
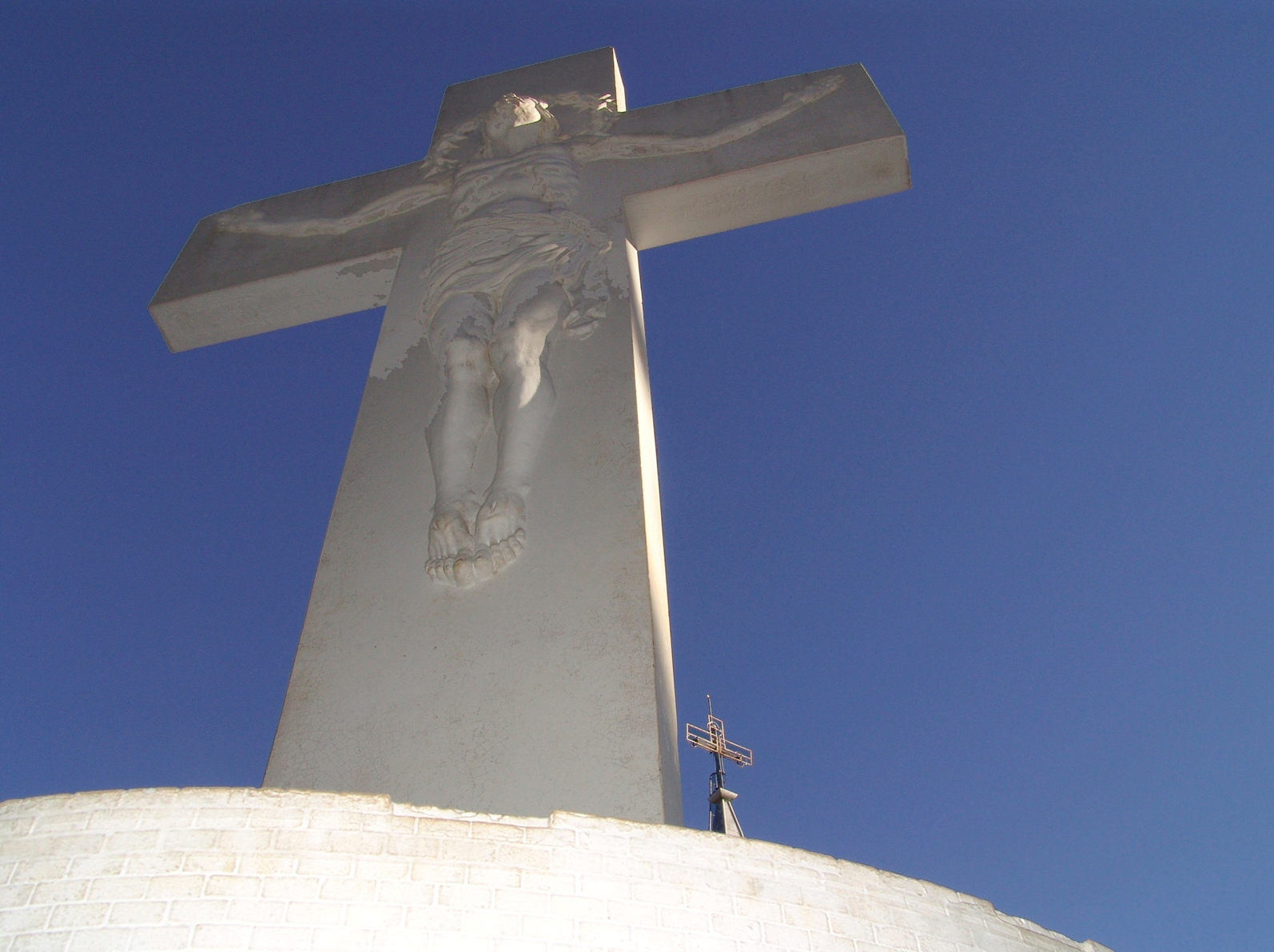
Christ Statue in Largo Santa Cruz

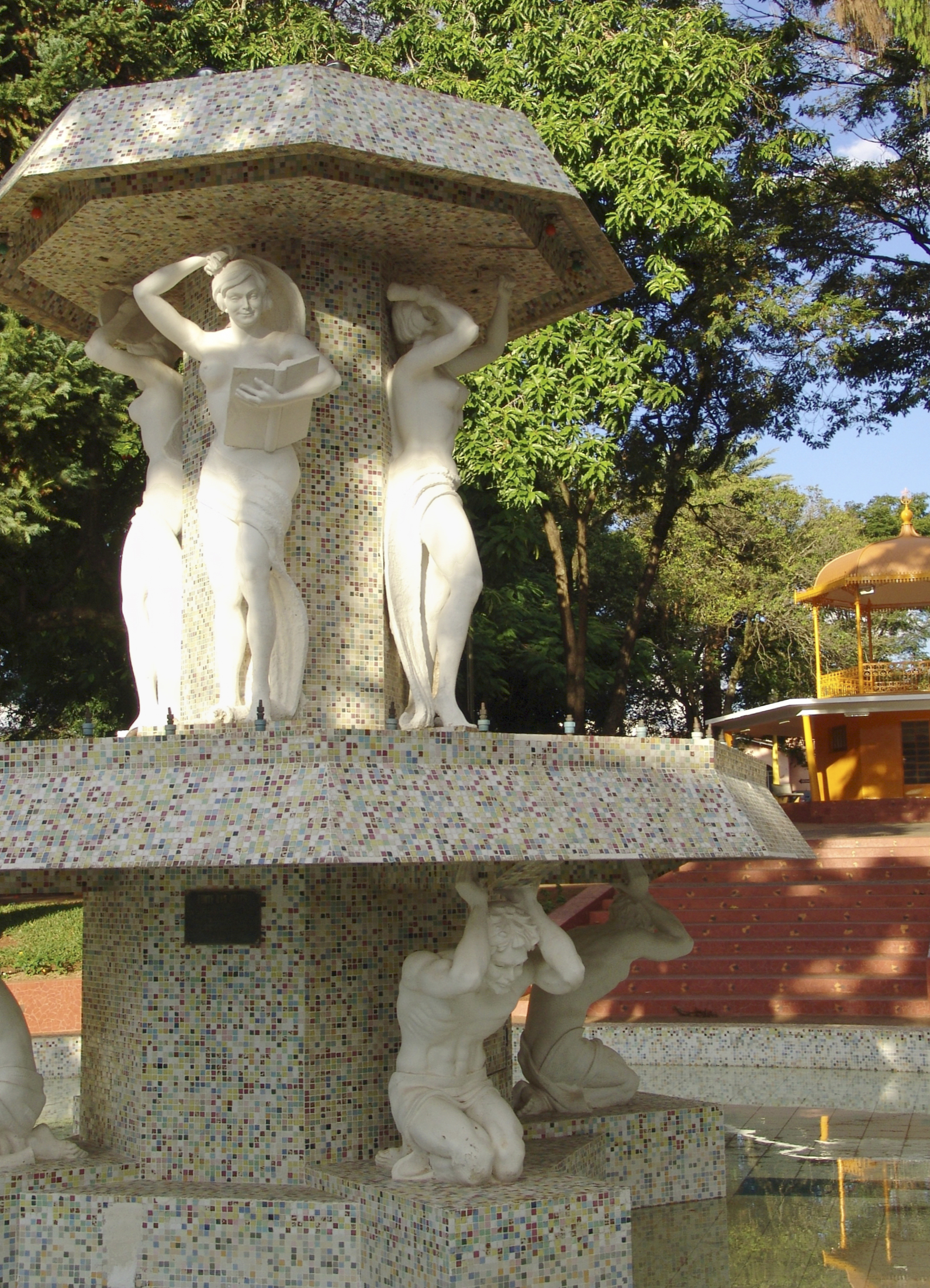
Luminous fountain in Largo São João

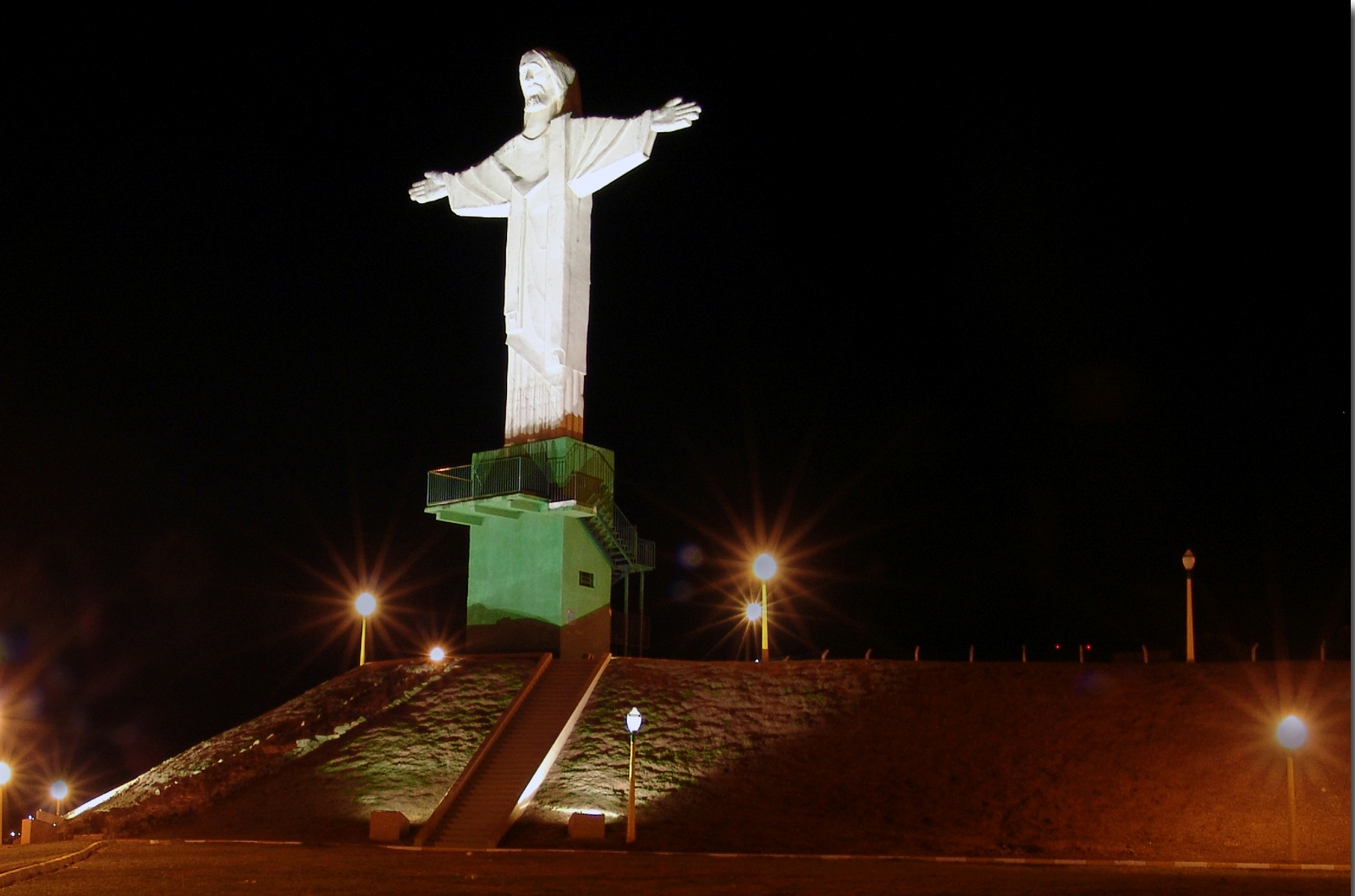
Cristo Redentor at night

== See also ==
- List of municipalities in São Paulo
