= Itaí =

Itaí Itaíense
- Municipality
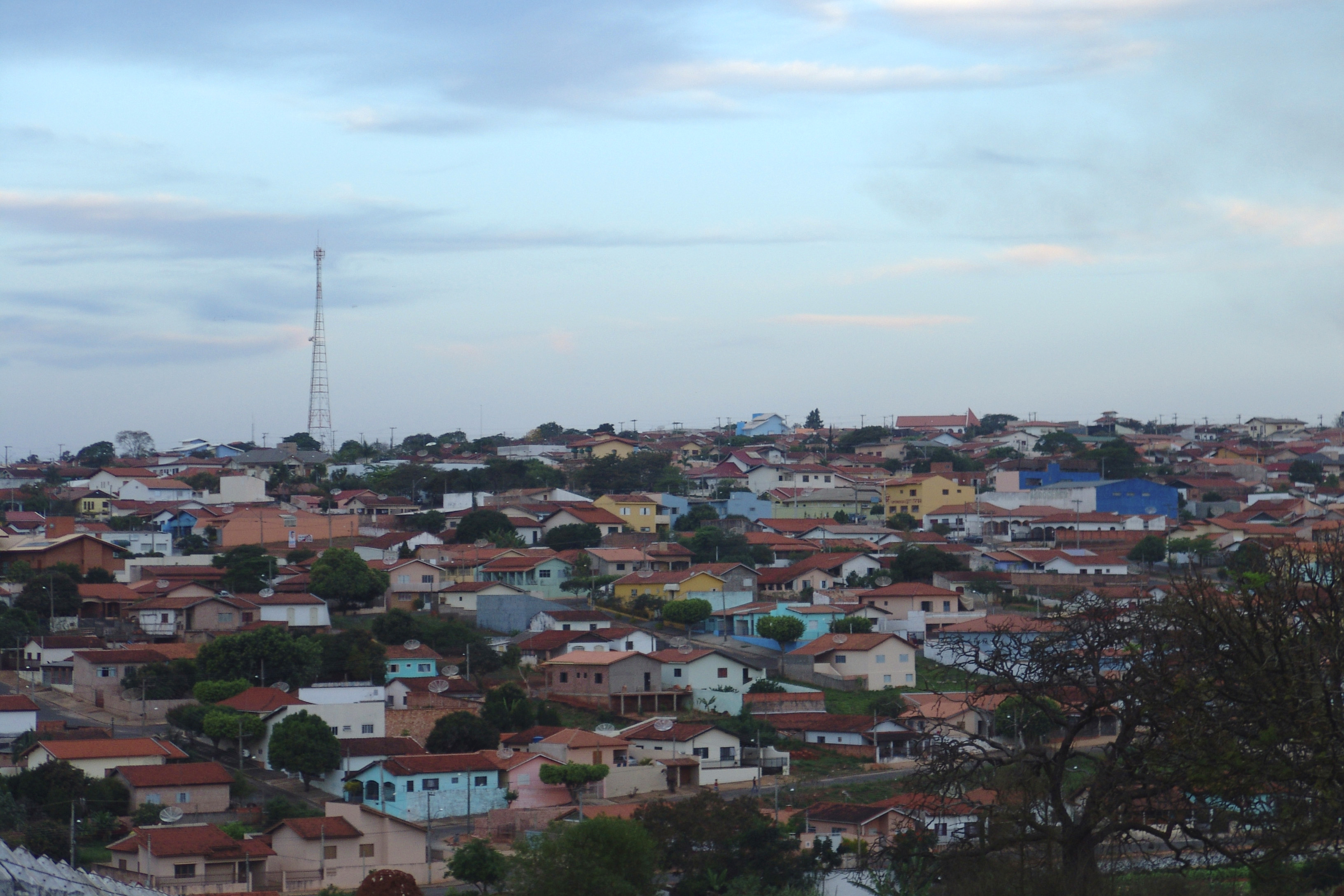

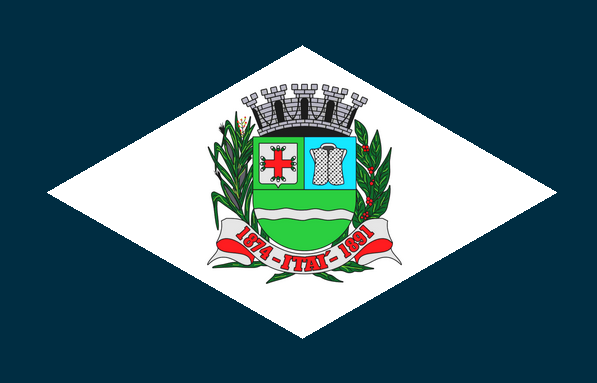
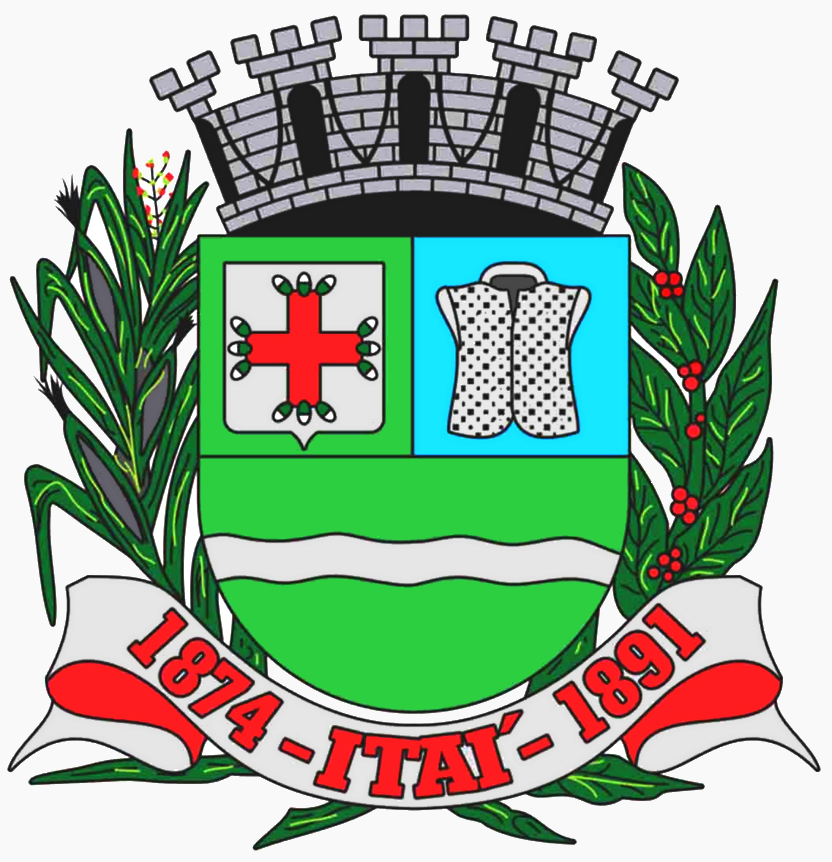
- Flag Coat of arms

- Location in São Paulo state

- Location in Brazil
- Coordinates: 23°25′4″S 49°5′26″W
- Country: Brazil
- Region: Southeast
- State: São Paulo
- Foundation: April 16, 1874; 152 years ago

Government
  - Mayor: José Ramiro Antunes do Prado (PSDB, 2021-2024)

Area
  - Municipality: 1.093 km^{2} (0.422 sq mi)
- Elevation: 654 m (2,146 ft)

Population (2020)
  - Municipality: 27,382
  - Density: 251/km^{2} (650/sq mi)
  - Metro: auto
- Demonym: Itaíense
- Time zone: UTC−3 (BRT)
- Postal code: 18730-000
- Area code: 14

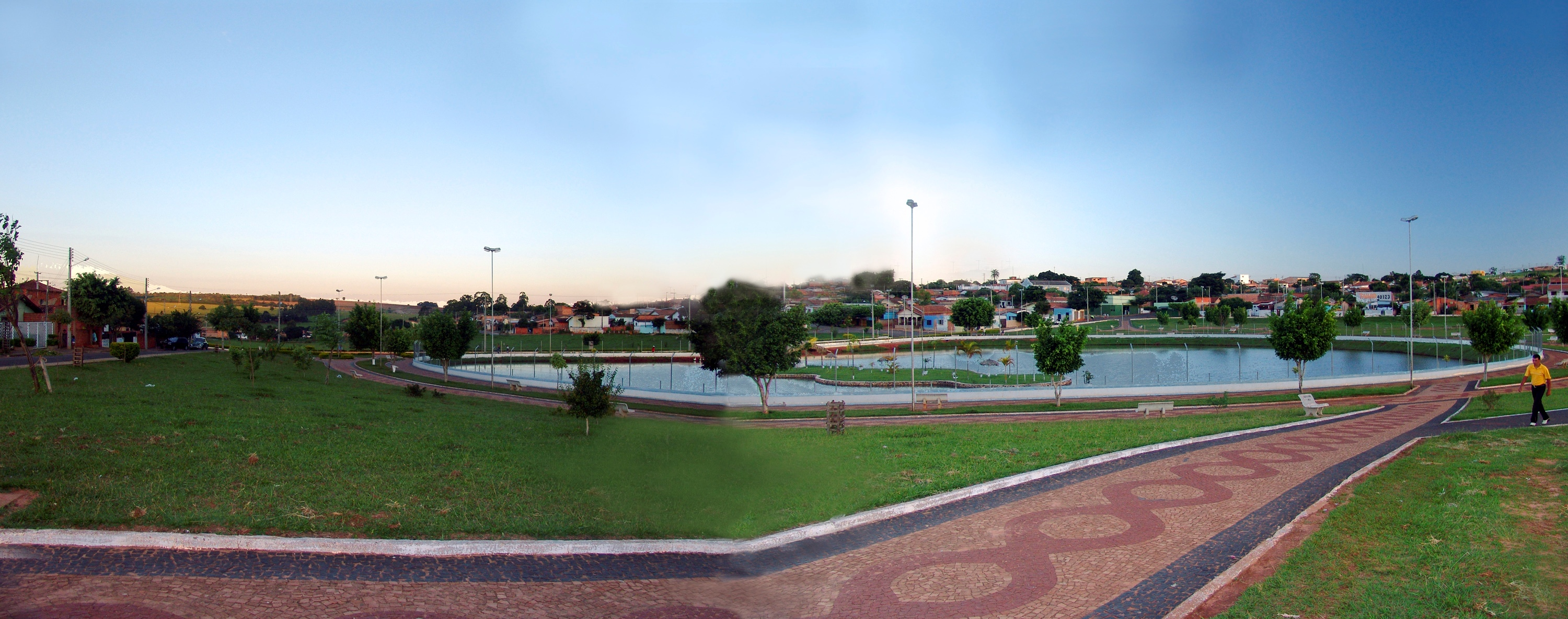
A park in Itaí

Itaí is a municipality in the state of São Paulo in Brazil. The population is 27,382 (2020 est.) in an area of 1,083 km^{2} (418 sq mi). The elevation is 614 m. This place name comes from the Tupi language, "Itaí" means river stone. The Tropic of Capricorn crosses the city of Itaí.

== History ==
Farmers close to the mouth of the Taquari River have difficulties in supplying and marketing their products given the distance from the nearest village, which was Faxina (now Itapeva). Thus, in 1869, Salvador de Freitas, José Silveira Melo, Manoel Pedroso de Oliveira and Captain José Floriano, founded on the slope of Serrinha, close to the Carrapatos river, a village with the name of Santo Antônio da Ponta da Serra, a name chosen in tribute to the patron saint and to define the position occupied by the nucleus.

The forty acres of the patrimony were acquired from Bernardino Leite by Salvador de Freitas and José Silveira Melo, Manoel Pedroso and captain José Floriano were responsible for the construction of the first building measuring approximately 80 square meters. In these forty acres a chapel and the first houses in the village were installed.

The village of Santo Antônio, founded by farmers, grew and organized itself around this chapel, which can be considered as the ground zero of the city of Itaí. At the time these buildings were built, a unique structure that existed there was a wooden and clay house, inhabited by Miguel Correa Melo and located at the northern end of today's Rua Salvador de Freitas.

As early as 1870, the initial plan of the village was drawn up and the square and streets were demarcated and places. In 1872, the locality already had around fifty habitable houses, showing a high rate of development compared to other villages existing in the region until that time.

This small initial development favored the transformation of the village into a parish on April 16, 1874. From that day on, the new parish was renamed "Santo Antônio da Boa Vista", belonging to the municipality of Itapetininga. On May 1, 1891, the parish was elevated to the category of village. On December 19, 1906, the village was elevated to the category of city and on November 25, 1920, by state law nº 1748, it completes its current name, Itaí. [3]

The neighboring village, Bom Sucesso (currently Paranapanema), which also began to form, was elevated to the category of parish, passing Santo Antônio da Ponta da Serra to its territory in March 1874. A month later, it was created in village of Santo Antônio das Pedras, a parish of Santo Antônio da Boa Vista, this last name being adopted for the old nucleus. In 1920, it was renamed Itaí, which in Tupi-Guarani means river stone ("ita" = stone + "y" = river).

== Media ==
In telecommunications, the city was served by Telecomunicações de São Paulo. In July 1998, this company was acquired by Telefónica, which adopted the Vivo brand in 2012. The company is currently an operator of cell phones, fixed lines, internet (fiber optics/4G) and television (satellite and cable).

== See also ==
- List of municipalities in São Paulo
