= SP-255 (São Paulo highway) =

State highway in São Paulo, Brazil

SP-255

Route information
- Length: 357.430 km (222.097 mi)

Location
- Country: Brazil
- State: São Paulo

Highway system
- Highways in Brazil; Federal; São Paulo State Highways

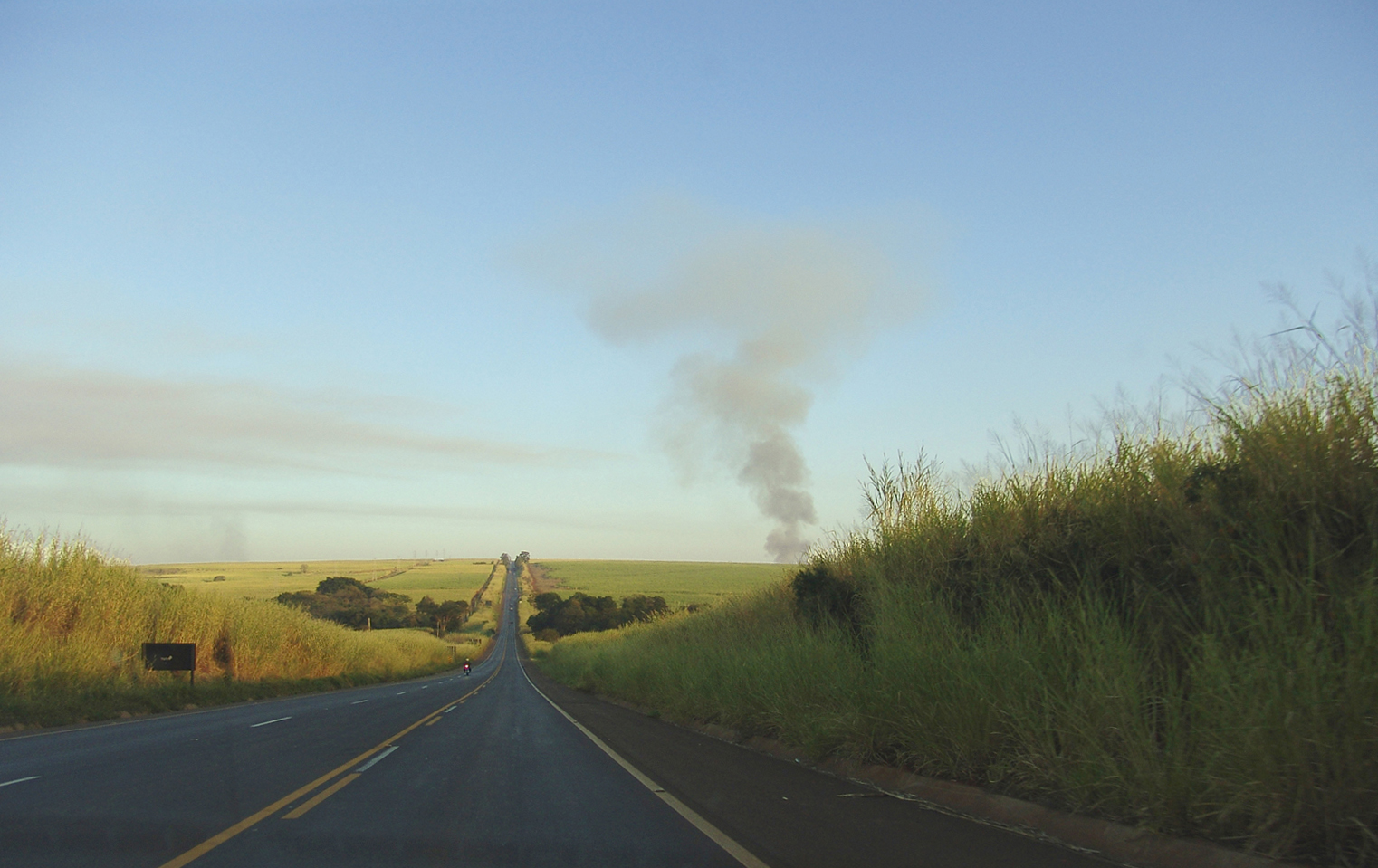

SP-255 is a state highway in the state of São Paulo in Brazil.

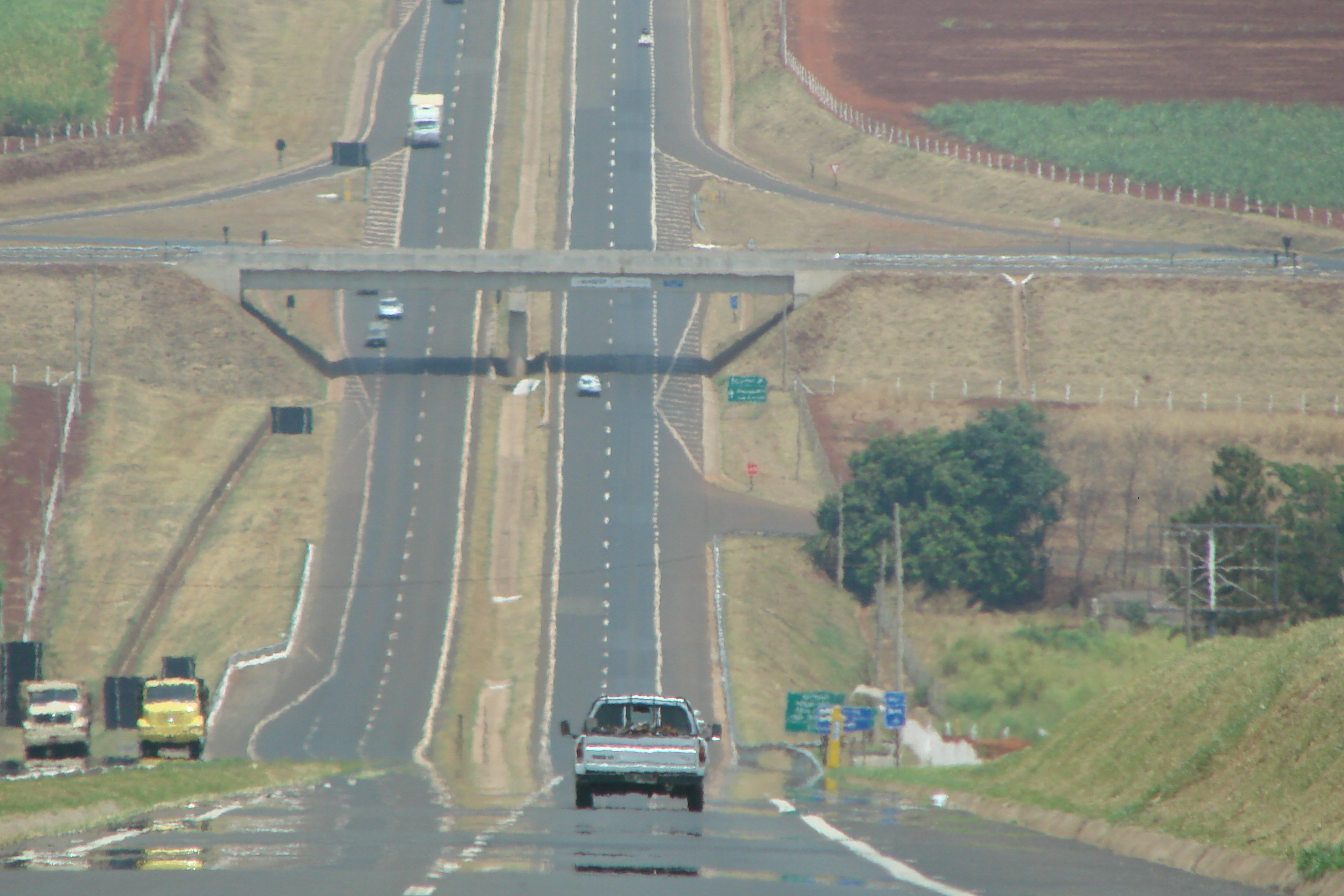
