= Arandu =

Arandu may refer to:

- Arandu, São Paulo, a municipality in the state of São Paulo, Brazil
- Arandu, Khyber Pakhtunkhwa, a town in Chitral District, Khyber Pakhtunkhwa, Pakistan
- Arandu, Gilgit-Baltistan, a town in Skardu District, Gilgit-Baltistan, Pakistan
