= QVP =

QVP or qvp may refer to:

- QVP, the IATA code for Avaré-Arandu Airport, Brazil
- qvp, the ISO 639-3 code for Pacaraos Quechua, Peru
