= Arandu, São Paulo =

Municipality in the state of São Paulo in Brazil

Arandu
- Municipality
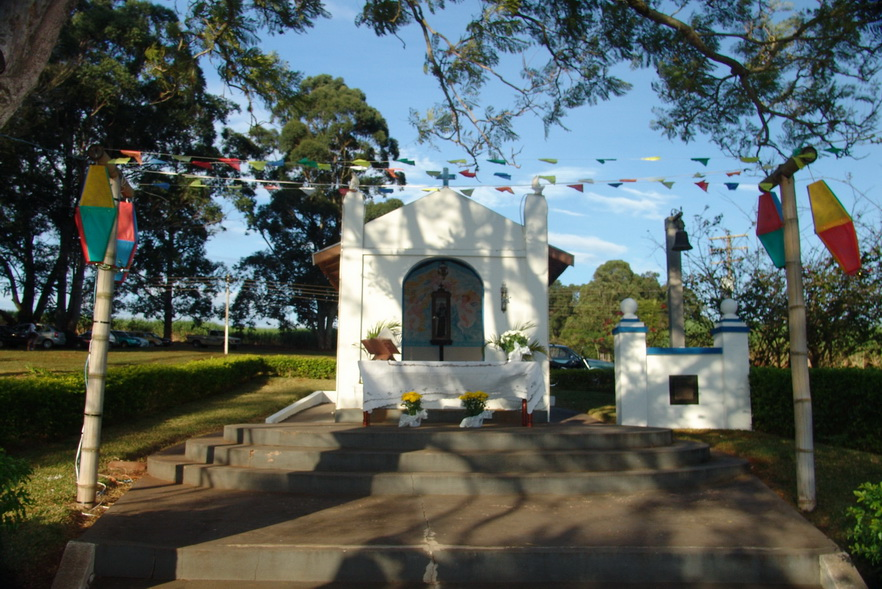

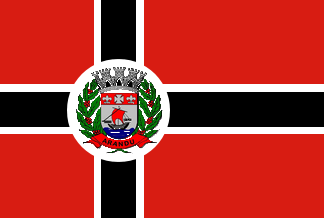
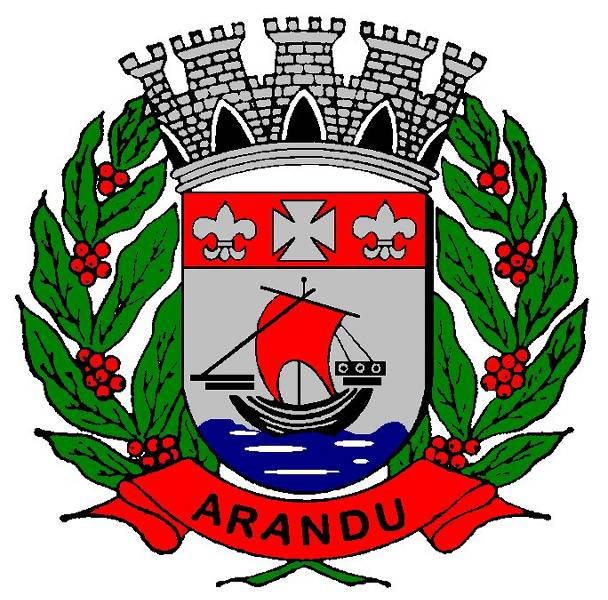
- Flag Coat of arms

- Location in São Paulo state

- Location in Brazil
- Coordinates: 23°8′5″S 49°3′15″W
- Country: Brazil
- Region: Southeast
- State: São Paulo

Area
  - Total: 286 km^{2} (110 sq mi)

Population (2020)
  - Total: 6,365
  - Density: 22.3/km^{2} (57.6/sq mi)
- Time zone: UTC−3 (BRT)

Arandu is a Brazilian municipality of the state of São Paulo. The population is 6,365 (2020 est.) in an area of 286 km^{2}. The city is served by Avaré-Arandu Airport located at the adjoining municipality of Avaré.

== Demographics ==
Historical population (municipality)
Year	Population	%±
1970	5,239	—
1980	4,164	−20.5%
1991	5,620	35.0%
2000	6,065	7.9%
2010	6,123	1.0%
2022	6,885	12.4%
Est. 2024	7,050	2.4%

== Media ==
In telecommunications, the city was served by Companhia Telefônica Brasileira until 1973, when it began to be served by Telecomunicações de São Paulo. In July 1998, this company was acquired by Telefónica, which adopted the Vivo brand in 2012.

The company is currently an operator of cell phones, fixed lines, internet (fiber optics/4G) and television (satellite and cable).

== See also ==
- List of municipalities in São Paulo
