= Arandu, Gilgit-Baltistan =

Town in Gilgit-Baltistan, Pakistan

Arandu is a town in Skardu District, Gilgit-Baltistan.
