= Avaré-Arandu Airport =

Comandante Luiz Gonzaga Lutti Regional Airport Aeroporto Regional Comandante Luiz Gonzaga Lutti
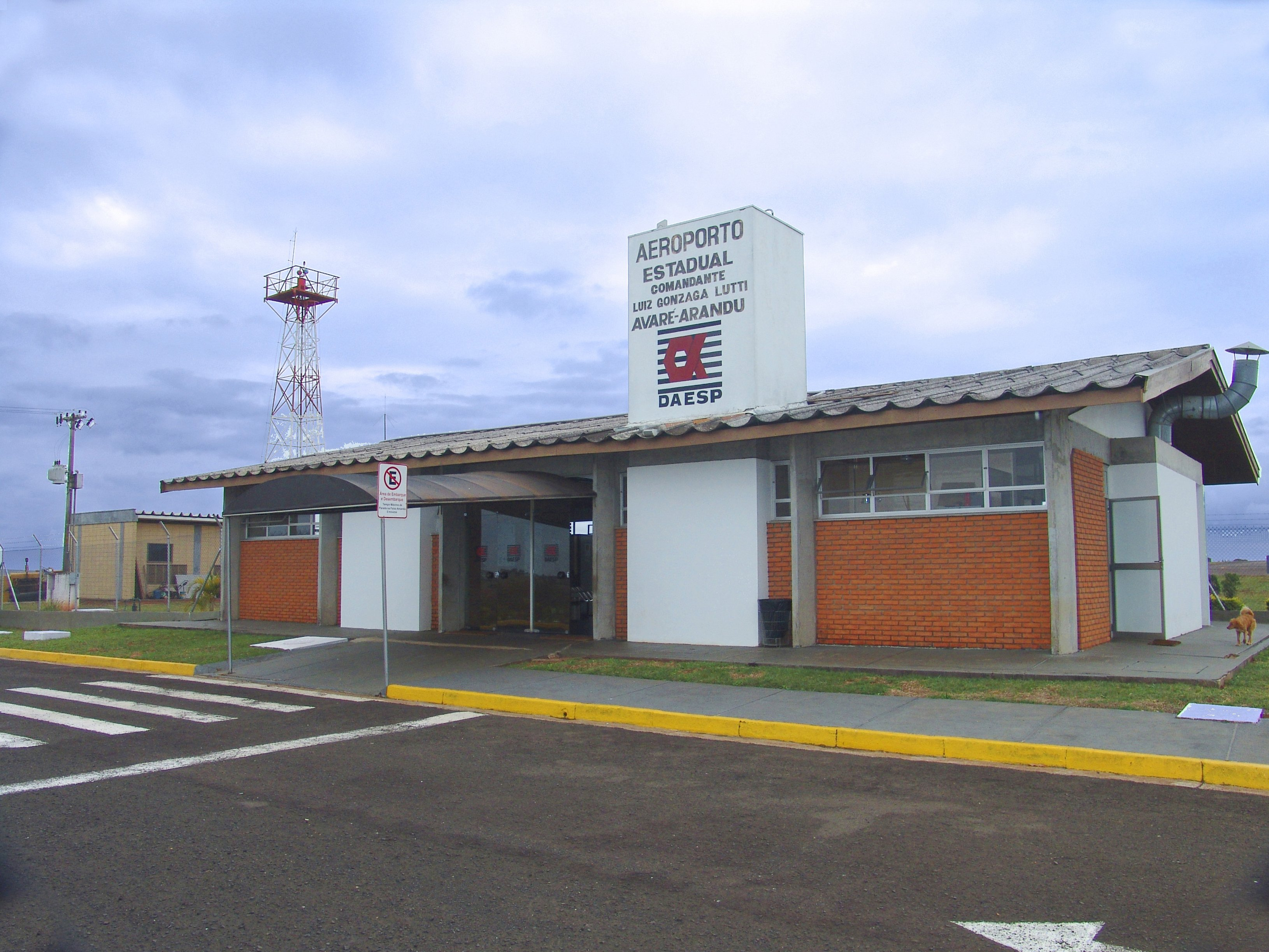
- IATA: QVP; ICAO: SDRR; LID: SP0028

Summary
- Airport type: Public
- Operator: DAESP (1990–2021); Rede Voa (2021–present)
- Serves: Avaré / Arandu
- Time zone: BRT (UTC−03:00)
- Elevation AMSL: 798 m (2,618 ft)
- Coordinates: 23°05′32″S 048°59′14″W
- Website: www.voa-sp.com.br/aeroporto/aeroporto-estadual-avare/

Map
- Location in Brazil QVP (Brazil)

Runways
Direction	Length		Surface
Direction	m	ft	Surface
15/33	1,480	4,856	Asphalt

Statistics (2019)
- Passengers: 1,137 ▼37%
- Aircraft Operations: 560 ▼38%
- Statistics: DAESP; Sources: Airport Website, ANAC, DECEA

Comandante Luiz Gonzaga Lutti Regional Airport (IATA: QVP, ICAO: SDRR) is the airport serving Avaré and Arandu, Brazil.

It is operated by Rede Voa.

== History ==
The airport was commissioned in 1990.

On July 15, 2021 the concession of the airport was auctioned to Rede Voa, under the name Consórcio Voa NW e Voa SE. The airport was previously operated by DAESP.

== Access ==
The airport is located 10 km (6 mi) from downtown Avaré and 13 km (8 mi) from downtown Arandu.

== See also ==
- List of airports in Brazil
